

48001–48100 

|-bgcolor=#fefefe
| 48001 ||  || — || January 24, 2001 || Socorro || LINEAR || H || align=right | 1.7 km || 
|-id=002 bgcolor=#fefefe
| 48002 ||  || — || January 19, 2001 || Socorro || LINEAR || NYS || align=right | 1.8 km || 
|-id=003 bgcolor=#d6d6d6
| 48003 ||  || — || January 21, 2001 || Socorro || LINEAR || — || align=right | 7.9 km || 
|-id=004 bgcolor=#fefefe
| 48004 ||  || — || January 31, 2001 || Desert Beaver || W. K. Y. Yeung || NYS || align=right | 2.1 km || 
|-id=005 bgcolor=#fefefe
| 48005 ||  || — || January 26, 2001 || Socorro || LINEAR || — || align=right | 2.5 km || 
|-id=006 bgcolor=#fefefe
| 48006 ||  || — || January 30, 2001 || Socorro || LINEAR || — || align=right | 2.2 km || 
|-id=007 bgcolor=#fefefe
| 48007 ||  || — || January 30, 2001 || Socorro || LINEAR || — || align=right | 6.7 km || 
|-id=008 bgcolor=#fefefe
| 48008 ||  || — || January 31, 2001 || Socorro || LINEAR || — || align=right | 2.0 km || 
|-id=009 bgcolor=#fefefe
| 48009 ||  || — || January 31, 2001 || Socorro || LINEAR || NYS || align=right | 1.9 km || 
|-id=010 bgcolor=#fefefe
| 48010 ||  || — || January 31, 2001 || Socorro || LINEAR || PHO || align=right | 4.0 km || 
|-id=011 bgcolor=#fefefe
| 48011 ||  || — || January 29, 2001 || Haleakala || NEAT || — || align=right | 2.1 km || 
|-id=012 bgcolor=#fefefe
| 48012 ||  || — || January 25, 2001 || Kitt Peak || Spacewatch || — || align=right | 5.6 km || 
|-id=013 bgcolor=#fefefe
| 48013 ||  || — || February 1, 2001 || Socorro || LINEAR || — || align=right | 2.0 km || 
|-id=014 bgcolor=#fefefe
| 48014 ||  || — || February 1, 2001 || Socorro || LINEAR || FLO || align=right | 1.6 km || 
|-id=015 bgcolor=#fefefe
| 48015 ||  || — || February 1, 2001 || Socorro || LINEAR || — || align=right | 2.6 km || 
|-id=016 bgcolor=#fefefe
| 48016 ||  || — || February 1, 2001 || Socorro || LINEAR || PHO || align=right | 3.5 km || 
|-id=017 bgcolor=#E9E9E9
| 48017 ||  || — || February 1, 2001 || Socorro || LINEAR || — || align=right | 2.4 km || 
|-id=018 bgcolor=#fefefe
| 48018 ||  || — || February 15, 2001 || Črni Vrh || Črni Vrh || — || align=right | 3.1 km || 
|-id=019 bgcolor=#E9E9E9
| 48019 ||  || — || February 15, 2001 || Socorro || LINEAR || — || align=right | 3.8 km || 
|-id=020 bgcolor=#fefefe
| 48020 || 2001 DC || — || February 16, 2001 || Črni Vrh || Črni Vrh || — || align=right | 1.5 km || 
|-id=021 bgcolor=#fefefe
| 48021 ||  || — || February 16, 2001 || Višnjan Observatory || K. Korlević || FLO || align=right | 2.7 km || 
|-id=022 bgcolor=#E9E9E9
| 48022 ||  || — || February 16, 2001 || Oizumi || T. Kobayashi || — || align=right | 2.7 km || 
|-id=023 bgcolor=#E9E9E9
| 48023 ||  || — || February 16, 2001 || Oizumi || T. Kobayashi || — || align=right | 2.4 km || 
|-id=024 bgcolor=#fefefe
| 48024 ||  || — || February 16, 2001 || Socorro || LINEAR || V || align=right | 1.9 km || 
|-id=025 bgcolor=#fefefe
| 48025 ||  || — || February 16, 2001 || Socorro || LINEAR || — || align=right | 3.1 km || 
|-id=026 bgcolor=#fefefe
| 48026 ||  || — || February 17, 2001 || Socorro || LINEAR || V || align=right | 1.4 km || 
|-id=027 bgcolor=#fefefe
| 48027 ||  || — || February 17, 2001 || Socorro || LINEAR || V || align=right | 1.6 km || 
|-id=028 bgcolor=#fefefe
| 48028 ||  || — || February 17, 2001 || Socorro || LINEAR || NYS || align=right | 1.9 km || 
|-id=029 bgcolor=#fefefe
| 48029 ||  || — || February 19, 2001 || Socorro || LINEAR || V || align=right | 1.5 km || 
|-id=030 bgcolor=#fefefe
| 48030 ||  || — || February 19, 2001 || Socorro || LINEAR || — || align=right | 1.6 km || 
|-id=031 bgcolor=#fefefe
| 48031 ||  || — || February 19, 2001 || Socorro || LINEAR || — || align=right | 1.5 km || 
|-id=032 bgcolor=#E9E9E9
| 48032 ||  || — || February 19, 2001 || Socorro || LINEAR || — || align=right | 1.9 km || 
|-id=033 bgcolor=#fefefe
| 48033 ||  || — || February 19, 2001 || Socorro || LINEAR || — || align=right | 2.4 km || 
|-id=034 bgcolor=#fefefe
| 48034 ||  || — || February 19, 2001 || Socorro || LINEAR || MAS || align=right | 2.0 km || 
|-id=035 bgcolor=#fefefe
| 48035 ||  || — || February 19, 2001 || Socorro || LINEAR || NYS || align=right | 1.5 km || 
|-id=036 bgcolor=#fefefe
| 48036 ||  || — || February 19, 2001 || Socorro || LINEAR || FLO || align=right | 1.5 km || 
|-id=037 bgcolor=#fefefe
| 48037 ||  || — || February 19, 2001 || Socorro || LINEAR || — || align=right | 2.6 km || 
|-id=038 bgcolor=#E9E9E9
| 48038 ||  || — || February 19, 2001 || Socorro || LINEAR || PAE || align=right | 7.0 km || 
|-id=039 bgcolor=#fefefe
| 48039 ||  || — || February 19, 2001 || Socorro || LINEAR || — || align=right | 2.2 km || 
|-id=040 bgcolor=#fefefe
| 48040 ||  || — || February 19, 2001 || Socorro || LINEAR || NYS || align=right | 1.9 km || 
|-id=041 bgcolor=#fefefe
| 48041 ||  || — || February 19, 2001 || Socorro || LINEAR || V || align=right | 1.8 km || 
|-id=042 bgcolor=#fefefe
| 48042 ||  || — || February 19, 2001 || Socorro || LINEAR || — || align=right | 2.9 km || 
|-id=043 bgcolor=#fefefe
| 48043 ||  || — || February 19, 2001 || Socorro || LINEAR || V || align=right | 2.0 km || 
|-id=044 bgcolor=#d6d6d6
| 48044 ||  || — || February 19, 2001 || Socorro || LINEAR || — || align=right | 7.3 km || 
|-id=045 bgcolor=#fefefe
| 48045 ||  || — || February 26, 2001 || Oizumi || T. Kobayashi || FLO || align=right | 1.3 km || 
|-id=046 bgcolor=#fefefe
| 48046 ||  || — || February 23, 2001 || Kitt Peak || Spacewatch || NYS || align=right | 4.6 km || 
|-id=047 bgcolor=#fefefe
| 48047 Houghten ||  ||  || February 22, 2001 || Nogales || Tenagra II Obs. || V || align=right | 1.5 km || 
|-id=048 bgcolor=#E9E9E9
| 48048 ||  || — || February 24, 2001 || Haleakala || NEAT || — || align=right | 6.7 km || 
|-id=049 bgcolor=#fefefe
| 48049 ||  || — || February 22, 2001 || Socorro || LINEAR || — || align=right | 3.4 km || 
|-id=050 bgcolor=#E9E9E9
| 48050 ||  || — || February 20, 2001 || Haleakala || NEAT || — || align=right | 5.7 km || 
|-id=051 bgcolor=#fefefe
| 48051 ||  || — || February 19, 2001 || Socorro || LINEAR || — || align=right | 1.6 km || 
|-id=052 bgcolor=#E9E9E9
| 48052 ||  || — || February 17, 2001 || Socorro || LINEAR || — || align=right | 3.2 km || 
|-id=053 bgcolor=#E9E9E9
| 48053 || 2001 EL || — || March 2, 2001 || Desert Beaver || W. K. Y. Yeung || — || align=right | 6.2 km || 
|-id=054 bgcolor=#fefefe
| 48054 || 2001 EM || — || March 2, 2001 || Desert Beaver || W. K. Y. Yeung || — || align=right | 2.5 km || 
|-id=055 bgcolor=#fefefe
| 48055 ||  || — || March 2, 2001 || Anderson Mesa || LONEOS || — || align=right | 1.6 km || 
|-id=056 bgcolor=#fefefe
| 48056 ||  || — || March 2, 2001 || Anderson Mesa || LONEOS || — || align=right | 2.2 km || 
|-id=057 bgcolor=#fefefe
| 48057 ||  || — || March 2, 2001 || Anderson Mesa || LONEOS || — || align=right | 1.6 km || 
|-id=058 bgcolor=#fefefe
| 48058 ||  || — || March 2, 2001 || Anderson Mesa || LONEOS || — || align=right | 2.1 km || 
|-id=059 bgcolor=#fefefe
| 48059 ||  || — || March 2, 2001 || Anderson Mesa || LONEOS || NYS || align=right | 1.6 km || 
|-id=060 bgcolor=#fefefe
| 48060 ||  || — || March 2, 2001 || Anderson Mesa || LONEOS || — || align=right | 2.1 km || 
|-id=061 bgcolor=#E9E9E9
| 48061 ||  || — || March 2, 2001 || Anderson Mesa || LONEOS || — || align=right | 2.6 km || 
|-id=062 bgcolor=#E9E9E9
| 48062 ||  || — || March 2, 2001 || Anderson Mesa || LONEOS || — || align=right | 2.3 km || 
|-id=063 bgcolor=#fefefe
| 48063 ||  || — || March 2, 2001 || Anderson Mesa || LONEOS || V || align=right | 1.5 km || 
|-id=064 bgcolor=#fefefe
| 48064 ||  || — || March 15, 2001 || Haleakala || NEAT || — || align=right | 2.0 km || 
|-id=065 bgcolor=#d6d6d6
| 48065 ||  || — || March 15, 2001 || Socorro || LINEAR || — || align=right | 8.1 km || 
|-id=066 bgcolor=#fefefe
| 48066 ||  || — || March 15, 2001 || Anderson Mesa || LONEOS || NYS || align=right | 2.4 km || 
|-id=067 bgcolor=#fefefe
| 48067 ||  || — || March 15, 2001 || Anderson Mesa || LONEOS || — || align=right | 1.6 km || 
|-id=068 bgcolor=#fefefe
| 48068 ||  || — || March 2, 2001 || Anderson Mesa || LONEOS || — || align=right | 2.4 km || 
|-id=069 bgcolor=#d6d6d6
| 48069 || 2001 FP || — || March 16, 2001 || Socorro || LINEAR || — || align=right | 6.4 km || 
|-id=070 bgcolor=#d6d6d6
| 48070 Zizza ||  ||  || March 19, 2001 || Junk Bond || D. Healy || — || align=right | 9.1 km || 
|-id=071 bgcolor=#fefefe
| 48071 ||  || — || March 18, 2001 || Socorro || LINEAR || — || align=right | 4.5 km || 
|-id=072 bgcolor=#fefefe
| 48072 ||  || — || March 19, 2001 || Anderson Mesa || LONEOS || — || align=right | 2.7 km || 
|-id=073 bgcolor=#fefefe
| 48073 ||  || — || March 19, 2001 || Anderson Mesa || LONEOS || V || align=right | 2.2 km || 
|-id=074 bgcolor=#fefefe
| 48074 ||  || — || March 19, 2001 || Anderson Mesa || LONEOS || — || align=right | 2.1 km || 
|-id=075 bgcolor=#E9E9E9
| 48075 ||  || — || March 19, 2001 || Anderson Mesa || LONEOS || — || align=right | 2.3 km || 
|-id=076 bgcolor=#fefefe
| 48076 ||  || — || March 19, 2001 || Anderson Mesa || LONEOS || — || align=right | 2.0 km || 
|-id=077 bgcolor=#fefefe
| 48077 ||  || — || March 17, 2001 || Socorro || LINEAR || — || align=right | 2.0 km || 
|-id=078 bgcolor=#E9E9E9
| 48078 ||  || — || March 18, 2001 || Socorro || LINEAR || — || align=right | 5.0 km || 
|-id=079 bgcolor=#E9E9E9
| 48079 ||  || — || March 18, 2001 || Socorro || LINEAR || — || align=right | 2.2 km || 
|-id=080 bgcolor=#fefefe
| 48080 ||  || — || March 18, 2001 || Socorro || LINEAR || — || align=right | 3.1 km || 
|-id=081 bgcolor=#E9E9E9
| 48081 ||  || — || March 18, 2001 || Socorro || LINEAR || — || align=right | 4.2 km || 
|-id=082 bgcolor=#fefefe
| 48082 ||  || — || March 18, 2001 || Socorro || LINEAR || V || align=right | 1.8 km || 
|-id=083 bgcolor=#fefefe
| 48083 ||  || — || March 18, 2001 || Socorro || LINEAR || NYS || align=right | 1.4 km || 
|-id=084 bgcolor=#E9E9E9
| 48084 ||  || — || March 18, 2001 || Socorro || LINEAR || — || align=right | 5.1 km || 
|-id=085 bgcolor=#fefefe
| 48085 ||  || — || March 18, 2001 || Socorro || LINEAR || — || align=right | 3.7 km || 
|-id=086 bgcolor=#fefefe
| 48086 ||  || — || March 18, 2001 || Socorro || LINEAR || — || align=right | 1.5 km || 
|-id=087 bgcolor=#E9E9E9
| 48087 ||  || — || March 18, 2001 || Socorro || LINEAR || — || align=right | 2.5 km || 
|-id=088 bgcolor=#E9E9E9
| 48088 ||  || — || March 18, 2001 || Socorro || LINEAR || — || align=right | 3.0 km || 
|-id=089 bgcolor=#E9E9E9
| 48089 ||  || — || March 18, 2001 || Socorro || LINEAR || — || align=right | 4.9 km || 
|-id=090 bgcolor=#fefefe
| 48090 ||  || — || March 18, 2001 || Socorro || LINEAR || NYS || align=right | 1.9 km || 
|-id=091 bgcolor=#fefefe
| 48091 ||  || — || March 18, 2001 || Socorro || LINEAR || V || align=right | 2.0 km || 
|-id=092 bgcolor=#fefefe
| 48092 ||  || — || March 18, 2001 || Socorro || LINEAR || FLO || align=right | 2.8 km || 
|-id=093 bgcolor=#E9E9E9
| 48093 ||  || — || March 18, 2001 || Socorro || LINEAR || PAE || align=right | 5.3 km || 
|-id=094 bgcolor=#fefefe
| 48094 ||  || — || March 18, 2001 || Socorro || LINEAR || V || align=right | 1.9 km || 
|-id=095 bgcolor=#fefefe
| 48095 ||  || — || March 18, 2001 || Socorro || LINEAR || NYS || align=right | 2.1 km || 
|-id=096 bgcolor=#fefefe
| 48096 ||  || — || March 18, 2001 || Socorro || LINEAR || — || align=right | 1.9 km || 
|-id=097 bgcolor=#fefefe
| 48097 ||  || — || March 18, 2001 || Socorro || LINEAR || — || align=right | 2.0 km || 
|-id=098 bgcolor=#d6d6d6
| 48098 ||  || — || March 18, 2001 || Socorro || LINEAR || — || align=right | 9.7 km || 
|-id=099 bgcolor=#d6d6d6
| 48099 ||  || — || March 19, 2001 || Socorro || LINEAR || — || align=right | 7.7 km || 
|-id=100 bgcolor=#E9E9E9
| 48100 ||  || — || March 21, 2001 || Socorro || LINEAR || EUN || align=right | 3.3 km || 
|}

48101–48200 

|-bgcolor=#fefefe
| 48101 ||  || — || March 19, 2001 || Socorro || LINEAR || NYS || align=right | 1.4 km || 
|-id=102 bgcolor=#fefefe
| 48102 ||  || — || March 19, 2001 || Socorro || LINEAR || V || align=right | 2.3 km || 
|-id=103 bgcolor=#fefefe
| 48103 ||  || — || March 19, 2001 || Socorro || LINEAR || — || align=right | 1.8 km || 
|-id=104 bgcolor=#E9E9E9
| 48104 ||  || — || March 19, 2001 || Socorro || LINEAR || — || align=right | 4.3 km || 
|-id=105 bgcolor=#fefefe
| 48105 ||  || — || March 19, 2001 || Socorro || LINEAR || — || align=right | 2.4 km || 
|-id=106 bgcolor=#E9E9E9
| 48106 ||  || — || March 19, 2001 || Socorro || LINEAR || — || align=right | 3.7 km || 
|-id=107 bgcolor=#fefefe
| 48107 ||  || — || March 19, 2001 || Socorro || LINEAR || — || align=right | 2.9 km || 
|-id=108 bgcolor=#fefefe
| 48108 ||  || — || March 19, 2001 || Socorro || LINEAR || — || align=right | 2.8 km || 
|-id=109 bgcolor=#fefefe
| 48109 ||  || — || March 19, 2001 || Socorro || LINEAR || — || align=right | 2.6 km || 
|-id=110 bgcolor=#E9E9E9
| 48110 ||  || — || March 19, 2001 || Socorro || LINEAR || — || align=right | 3.1 km || 
|-id=111 bgcolor=#fefefe
| 48111 ||  || — || March 19, 2001 || Socorro || LINEAR || V || align=right | 1.7 km || 
|-id=112 bgcolor=#fefefe
| 48112 ||  || — || March 19, 2001 || Socorro || LINEAR || V || align=right | 1.9 km || 
|-id=113 bgcolor=#fefefe
| 48113 ||  || — || March 19, 2001 || Socorro || LINEAR || V || align=right | 1.9 km || 
|-id=114 bgcolor=#fefefe
| 48114 ||  || — || March 19, 2001 || Socorro || LINEAR || FLO || align=right | 2.0 km || 
|-id=115 bgcolor=#fefefe
| 48115 ||  || — || March 24, 2001 || Socorro || LINEAR || — || align=right | 2.9 km || 
|-id=116 bgcolor=#fefefe
| 48116 ||  || — || March 24, 2001 || Socorro || LINEAR || V || align=right | 1.9 km || 
|-id=117 bgcolor=#E9E9E9
| 48117 ||  || — || March 24, 2001 || Socorro || LINEAR || — || align=right | 2.6 km || 
|-id=118 bgcolor=#fefefe
| 48118 ||  || — || March 16, 2001 || Socorro || LINEAR || V || align=right | 2.0 km || 
|-id=119 bgcolor=#E9E9E9
| 48119 ||  || — || March 16, 2001 || Socorro || LINEAR || — || align=right | 2.8 km || 
|-id=120 bgcolor=#fefefe
| 48120 ||  || — || March 16, 2001 || Socorro || LINEAR || V || align=right | 1.9 km || 
|-id=121 bgcolor=#fefefe
| 48121 ||  || — || March 16, 2001 || Socorro || LINEAR || — || align=right | 3.7 km || 
|-id=122 bgcolor=#E9E9E9
| 48122 ||  || — || March 28, 2001 || Socorro || LINEAR || — || align=right | 4.8 km || 
|-id=123 bgcolor=#E9E9E9
| 48123 ||  || — || March 17, 2001 || Socorro || LINEAR || — || align=right | 2.3 km || 
|-id=124 bgcolor=#fefefe
| 48124 ||  || — || March 17, 2001 || Socorro || LINEAR || — || align=right | 2.6 km || 
|-id=125 bgcolor=#fefefe
| 48125 ||  || — || March 18, 2001 || Socorro || LINEAR || MAS || align=right | 2.4 km || 
|-id=126 bgcolor=#fefefe
| 48126 ||  || — || March 18, 2001 || Socorro || LINEAR || — || align=right | 1.8 km || 
|-id=127 bgcolor=#E9E9E9
| 48127 ||  || — || March 18, 2001 || Anderson Mesa || LONEOS || — || align=right | 6.5 km || 
|-id=128 bgcolor=#fefefe
| 48128 ||  || — || March 18, 2001 || Anderson Mesa || LONEOS || — || align=right | 2.4 km || 
|-id=129 bgcolor=#fefefe
| 48129 ||  || — || March 18, 2001 || Socorro || LINEAR || — || align=right | 2.9 km || 
|-id=130 bgcolor=#E9E9E9
| 48130 ||  || — || March 20, 2001 || Haleakala || NEAT || EUN || align=right | 4.2 km || 
|-id=131 bgcolor=#d6d6d6
| 48131 ||  || — || March 20, 2001 || Haleakala || NEAT || — || align=right | 6.4 km || 
|-id=132 bgcolor=#E9E9E9
| 48132 ||  || — || March 29, 2001 || Desert Beaver || W. K. Y. Yeung || ADE || align=right | 7.9 km || 
|-id=133 bgcolor=#fefefe
| 48133 ||  || — || March 26, 2001 || Socorro || LINEAR || ERI || align=right | 3.9 km || 
|-id=134 bgcolor=#fefefe
| 48134 ||  || — || March 29, 2001 || Socorro || LINEAR || V || align=right | 2.0 km || 
|-id=135 bgcolor=#d6d6d6
| 48135 ||  || — || March 31, 2001 || Desert Beaver || W. K. Y. Yeung || — || align=right | 7.8 km || 
|-id=136 bgcolor=#E9E9E9
| 48136 ||  || — || March 23, 2001 || Anderson Mesa || LONEOS || — || align=right | 2.5 km || 
|-id=137 bgcolor=#fefefe
| 48137 ||  || — || March 23, 2001 || Anderson Mesa || LONEOS || V || align=right | 2.0 km || 
|-id=138 bgcolor=#E9E9E9
| 48138 ||  || — || March 23, 2001 || Anderson Mesa || LONEOS || — || align=right | 2.6 km || 
|-id=139 bgcolor=#E9E9E9
| 48139 ||  || — || March 23, 2001 || Anderson Mesa || LONEOS || — || align=right | 5.4 km || 
|-id=140 bgcolor=#E9E9E9
| 48140 ||  || — || March 24, 2001 || Anderson Mesa || LONEOS || — || align=right | 3.9 km || 
|-id=141 bgcolor=#fefefe
| 48141 ||  || — || March 24, 2001 || Anderson Mesa || LONEOS || — || align=right | 2.1 km || 
|-id=142 bgcolor=#d6d6d6
| 48142 ||  || — || March 24, 2001 || Socorro || LINEAR || — || align=right | 6.1 km || 
|-id=143 bgcolor=#E9E9E9
| 48143 ||  || — || March 26, 2001 || Socorro || LINEAR || EUN || align=right | 2.5 km || 
|-id=144 bgcolor=#fefefe
| 48144 ||  || — || March 26, 2001 || Haleakala || NEAT || V || align=right | 1.4 km || 
|-id=145 bgcolor=#fefefe
| 48145 ||  || — || March 27, 2001 || Anderson Mesa || LONEOS || — || align=right | 1.9 km || 
|-id=146 bgcolor=#fefefe
| 48146 ||  || — || March 29, 2001 || Anderson Mesa || LONEOS || — || align=right | 2.8 km || 
|-id=147 bgcolor=#E9E9E9
| 48147 ||  || — || March 29, 2001 || Anderson Mesa || LONEOS || — || align=right | 5.5 km || 
|-id=148 bgcolor=#E9E9E9
| 48148 ||  || — || March 29, 2001 || Haleakala || NEAT || — || align=right | 8.2 km || 
|-id=149 bgcolor=#fefefe
| 48149 ||  || — || March 18, 2001 || Socorro || LINEAR || — || align=right | 1.5 km || 
|-id=150 bgcolor=#fefefe
| 48150 ||  || — || March 18, 2001 || Haleakala || NEAT || — || align=right | 2.4 km || 
|-id=151 bgcolor=#E9E9E9
| 48151 ||  || — || March 23, 2001 || Anderson Mesa || LONEOS || — || align=right | 5.8 km || 
|-id=152 bgcolor=#E9E9E9
| 48152 ||  || — || March 25, 2001 || Anderson Mesa || LONEOS || EUN || align=right | 2.9 km || 
|-id=153 bgcolor=#d6d6d6
| 48153 ||  || — || March 31, 2001 || Kitt Peak || Spacewatch || LIX || align=right | 14 km || 
|-id=154 bgcolor=#E9E9E9
| 48154 ||  || — || April 15, 2001 || Socorro || LINEAR || CLO || align=right | 4.4 km || 
|-id=155 bgcolor=#fefefe
| 48155 ||  || — || April 15, 2001 || Socorro || LINEAR || — || align=right | 8.0 km || 
|-id=156 bgcolor=#fefefe
| 48156 ||  || — || April 13, 2001 || Kitt Peak || Spacewatch || FLO || align=right | 1.5 km || 
|-id=157 bgcolor=#E9E9E9
| 48157 ||  || — || April 15, 2001 || Socorro || LINEAR || GEF || align=right | 3.2 km || 
|-id=158 bgcolor=#E9E9E9
| 48158 ||  || — || April 15, 2001 || Socorro || LINEAR || — || align=right | 6.9 km || 
|-id=159 bgcolor=#E9E9E9
| 48159 Saint-Véran || 2001 HY ||  || April 16, 2001 || Saint-Véran || Saint-Véran Obs. || — || align=right | 3.8 km || 
|-id=160 bgcolor=#d6d6d6
| 48160 ||  || — || April 17, 2001 || Socorro || LINEAR || — || align=right | 4.1 km || 
|-id=161 bgcolor=#fefefe
| 48161 ||  || — || April 17, 2001 || Socorro || LINEAR || — || align=right | 2.8 km || 
|-id=162 bgcolor=#E9E9E9
| 48162 ||  || — || April 17, 2001 || Desert Beaver || W. K. Y. Yeung || — || align=right | 2.6 km || 
|-id=163 bgcolor=#fefefe
| 48163 ||  || — || April 16, 2001 || Socorro || LINEAR || V || align=right | 2.3 km || 
|-id=164 bgcolor=#d6d6d6
| 48164 ||  || — || April 16, 2001 || Socorro || LINEAR || — || align=right | 8.6 km || 
|-id=165 bgcolor=#d6d6d6
| 48165 ||  || — || April 16, 2001 || Socorro || LINEAR || — || align=right | 10 km || 
|-id=166 bgcolor=#fefefe
| 48166 ||  || — || April 16, 2001 || Socorro || LINEAR || FLO || align=right | 2.0 km || 
|-id=167 bgcolor=#d6d6d6
| 48167 ||  || — || April 18, 2001 || Socorro || LINEAR || — || align=right | 7.9 km || 
|-id=168 bgcolor=#fefefe
| 48168 ||  || — || April 18, 2001 || Socorro || LINEAR || — || align=right | 2.1 km || 
|-id=169 bgcolor=#E9E9E9
| 48169 ||  || — || April 18, 2001 || Socorro || LINEAR || — || align=right | 6.0 km || 
|-id=170 bgcolor=#fefefe
| 48170 ||  || — || April 18, 2001 || Socorro || LINEAR || — || align=right | 2.4 km || 
|-id=171 bgcolor=#fefefe
| 48171 Juza ||  ||  || April 23, 2001 || Ondřejov || P. Pravec, P. Kušnirák || — || align=right | 1.6 km || 
|-id=172 bgcolor=#d6d6d6
| 48172 ||  || — || April 24, 2001 || Kitt Peak || Spacewatch || — || align=right | 4.5 km || 
|-id=173 bgcolor=#E9E9E9
| 48173 ||  || — || April 24, 2001 || Kitt Peak || Spacewatch || HEN || align=right | 2.1 km || 
|-id=174 bgcolor=#fefefe
| 48174 ||  || — || April 23, 2001 || Socorro || LINEAR || V || align=right | 1.7 km || 
|-id=175 bgcolor=#E9E9E9
| 48175 ||  || — || April 26, 2001 || Desert Beaver || W. K. Y. Yeung || MAR || align=right | 3.1 km || 
|-id=176 bgcolor=#E9E9E9
| 48176 ||  || — || April 27, 2001 || Kitt Peak || Spacewatch || — || align=right | 2.1 km || 
|-id=177 bgcolor=#d6d6d6
| 48177 ||  || — || April 27, 2001 || Socorro || LINEAR || HYG || align=right | 9.4 km || 
|-id=178 bgcolor=#E9E9E9
| 48178 ||  || — || April 28, 2001 || Desert Beaver || W. K. Y. Yeung || HNS || align=right | 4.3 km || 
|-id=179 bgcolor=#d6d6d6
| 48179 ||  || — || April 28, 2001 || Desert Beaver || W. K. Y. Yeung || — || align=right | 7.1 km || 
|-id=180 bgcolor=#E9E9E9
| 48180 ||  || — || April 23, 2001 || Socorro || LINEAR || — || align=right | 5.5 km || 
|-id=181 bgcolor=#E9E9E9
| 48181 ||  || — || April 24, 2001 || Socorro || LINEAR || — || align=right | 6.3 km || 
|-id=182 bgcolor=#E9E9E9
| 48182 ||  || — || April 27, 2001 || Socorro || LINEAR || — || align=right | 7.9 km || 
|-id=183 bgcolor=#E9E9E9
| 48183 ||  || — || April 27, 2001 || Socorro || LINEAR || — || align=right | 5.9 km || 
|-id=184 bgcolor=#fefefe
| 48184 ||  || — || April 16, 2001 || Anderson Mesa || LONEOS || V || align=right | 1.3 km || 
|-id=185 bgcolor=#E9E9E9
| 48185 ||  || — || April 16, 2001 || Anderson Mesa || LONEOS || — || align=right | 2.7 km || 
|-id=186 bgcolor=#d6d6d6
| 48186 ||  || — || April 16, 2001 || Socorro || LINEAR || — || align=right | 6.8 km || 
|-id=187 bgcolor=#E9E9E9
| 48187 ||  || — || April 18, 2001 || Socorro || LINEAR || — || align=right | 4.2 km || 
|-id=188 bgcolor=#E9E9E9
| 48188 ||  || — || April 21, 2001 || Socorro || LINEAR || EUN || align=right | 2.7 km || 
|-id=189 bgcolor=#d6d6d6
| 48189 ||  || — || April 21, 2001 || Socorro || LINEAR || — || align=right | 11 km || 
|-id=190 bgcolor=#fefefe
| 48190 ||  || — || April 23, 2001 || Socorro || LINEAR || V || align=right | 1.8 km || 
|-id=191 bgcolor=#fefefe
| 48191 ||  || — || April 24, 2001 || Socorro || LINEAR || V || align=right | 1.7 km || 
|-id=192 bgcolor=#d6d6d6
| 48192 ||  || — || April 25, 2001 || Anderson Mesa || LONEOS || — || align=right | 7.3 km || 
|-id=193 bgcolor=#d6d6d6
| 48193 ||  || — || April 25, 2001 || Anderson Mesa || LONEOS || — || align=right | 7.7 km || 
|-id=194 bgcolor=#E9E9E9
| 48194 ||  || — || April 27, 2001 || Socorro || LINEAR || — || align=right | 5.1 km || 
|-id=195 bgcolor=#E9E9E9
| 48195 ||  || — || April 30, 2001 || Socorro || LINEAR || — || align=right | 2.3 km || 
|-id=196 bgcolor=#E9E9E9
| 48196 ||  || — || May 11, 2001 || Haleakala || NEAT || — || align=right | 4.8 km || 
|-id=197 bgcolor=#E9E9E9
| 48197 ||  || — || May 15, 2001 || Kitt Peak || Spacewatch || DOR || align=right | 7.3 km || 
|-id=198 bgcolor=#E9E9E9
| 48198 ||  || — || May 11, 2001 || Haleakala || NEAT || — || align=right | 2.0 km || 
|-id=199 bgcolor=#fefefe
| 48199 ||  || — || May 14, 2001 || Palomar || NEAT || — || align=right | 2.2 km || 
|-id=200 bgcolor=#E9E9E9
| 48200 Nishiokatakashi ||  ||  || May 19, 2001 || Bisei SG Center || BATTeRS || EUN || align=right | 3.5 km || 
|}

48201–48300 

|-bgcolor=#E9E9E9
| 48201 ||  || — || May 17, 2001 || Socorro || LINEAR || — || align=right | 3.4 km || 
|-id=202 bgcolor=#d6d6d6
| 48202 ||  || — || May 17, 2001 || Socorro || LINEAR || — || align=right | 10 km || 
|-id=203 bgcolor=#fefefe
| 48203 ||  || — || May 17, 2001 || Socorro || LINEAR || LCI || align=right | 3.0 km || 
|-id=204 bgcolor=#fefefe
| 48204 ||  || — || May 18, 2001 || Socorro || LINEAR || — || align=right | 2.5 km || 
|-id=205 bgcolor=#E9E9E9
| 48205 ||  || — || May 18, 2001 || Socorro || LINEAR || — || align=right | 6.5 km || 
|-id=206 bgcolor=#d6d6d6
| 48206 ||  || — || May 17, 2001 || Socorro || LINEAR || THM || align=right | 7.4 km || 
|-id=207 bgcolor=#E9E9E9
| 48207 ||  || — || May 18, 2001 || Socorro || LINEAR || KON || align=right | 4.6 km || 
|-id=208 bgcolor=#d6d6d6
| 48208 ||  || — || May 20, 2001 || Socorro || LINEAR || — || align=right | 7.0 km || 
|-id=209 bgcolor=#d6d6d6
| 48209 ||  || — || May 21, 2001 || Kitt Peak || Spacewatch || EOS || align=right | 6.1 km || 
|-id=210 bgcolor=#E9E9E9
| 48210 ||  || — || May 17, 2001 || Socorro || LINEAR || — || align=right | 3.4 km || 
|-id=211 bgcolor=#d6d6d6
| 48211 ||  || — || May 17, 2001 || Socorro || LINEAR || EOS || align=right | 5.5 km || 
|-id=212 bgcolor=#E9E9E9
| 48212 ||  || — || May 17, 2001 || Socorro || LINEAR || — || align=right | 7.9 km || 
|-id=213 bgcolor=#E9E9E9
| 48213 ||  || — || May 17, 2001 || Socorro || LINEAR || HNS || align=right | 4.1 km || 
|-id=214 bgcolor=#E9E9E9
| 48214 ||  || — || May 17, 2001 || Socorro || LINEAR || ADE || align=right | 7.3 km || 
|-id=215 bgcolor=#E9E9E9
| 48215 ||  || — || May 18, 2001 || Socorro || LINEAR || — || align=right | 4.7 km || 
|-id=216 bgcolor=#E9E9E9
| 48216 ||  || — || May 22, 2001 || Socorro || LINEAR || MAR || align=right | 3.1 km || 
|-id=217 bgcolor=#E9E9E9
| 48217 ||  || — || May 22, 2001 || Socorro || LINEAR || — || align=right | 2.8 km || 
|-id=218 bgcolor=#d6d6d6
| 48218 ||  || — || May 22, 2001 || Socorro || LINEAR || — || align=right | 15 km || 
|-id=219 bgcolor=#fefefe
| 48219 ||  || — || May 22, 2001 || Socorro || LINEAR || PHO || align=right | 7.7 km || 
|-id=220 bgcolor=#d6d6d6
| 48220 ||  || — || May 23, 2001 || Socorro || LINEAR || — || align=right | 8.4 km || 
|-id=221 bgcolor=#E9E9E9
| 48221 ||  || — || May 23, 2001 || Socorro || LINEAR || — || align=right | 2.9 km || 
|-id=222 bgcolor=#fefefe
| 48222 ||  || — || May 19, 2001 || Farpoint || G. Hug || V || align=right | 1.4 km || 
|-id=223 bgcolor=#E9E9E9
| 48223 ||  || — || May 22, 2001 || Socorro || LINEAR || — || align=right | 3.3 km || 
|-id=224 bgcolor=#E9E9E9
| 48224 ||  || — || May 22, 2001 || Socorro || LINEAR || — || align=right | 5.4 km || 
|-id=225 bgcolor=#E9E9E9
| 48225 ||  || — || May 22, 2001 || Socorro || LINEAR || — || align=right | 5.3 km || 
|-id=226 bgcolor=#E9E9E9
| 48226 ||  || — || May 22, 2001 || Socorro || LINEAR || — || align=right | 4.3 km || 
|-id=227 bgcolor=#d6d6d6
| 48227 ||  || — || May 26, 2001 || Socorro || LINEAR || — || align=right | 4.1 km || 
|-id=228 bgcolor=#E9E9E9
| 48228 ||  || — || May 26, 2001 || Socorro || LINEAR || GEF || align=right | 3.4 km || 
|-id=229 bgcolor=#E9E9E9
| 48229 ||  || — || May 20, 2001 || Haleakala || NEAT || — || align=right | 3.4 km || 
|-id=230 bgcolor=#E9E9E9
| 48230 ||  || — || May 22, 2001 || Anderson Mesa || LONEOS || — || align=right | 3.2 km || 
|-id=231 bgcolor=#E9E9E9
| 48231 ||  || — || May 22, 2001 || Socorro || LINEAR || — || align=right | 4.0 km || 
|-id=232 bgcolor=#fefefe
| 48232 ||  || — || May 24, 2001 || Anderson Mesa || LONEOS || — || align=right | 2.7 km || 
|-id=233 bgcolor=#d6d6d6
| 48233 ||  || — || June 15, 2001 || Socorro || LINEAR || — || align=right | 8.5 km || 
|-id=234 bgcolor=#d6d6d6
| 48234 ||  || — || June 15, 2001 || Socorro || LINEAR || EOS || align=right | 5.3 km || 
|-id=235 bgcolor=#fefefe
| 48235 ||  || — || June 19, 2001 || Socorro || LINEAR || — || align=right | 3.1 km || 
|-id=236 bgcolor=#E9E9E9
| 48236 ||  || — || June 19, 2001 || Socorro || LINEAR || — || align=right | 7.7 km || 
|-id=237 bgcolor=#d6d6d6
| 48237 ||  || — || June 23, 2001 || Powell || Powell Obs. || 7:4 || align=right | 9.9 km || 
|-id=238 bgcolor=#fefefe
| 48238 ||  || — || June 19, 2001 || Haleakala || NEAT || — || align=right | 3.7 km || 
|-id=239 bgcolor=#E9E9E9
| 48239 ||  || — || June 24, 2001 || Palomar || NEAT || — || align=right | 3.6 km || 
|-id=240 bgcolor=#d6d6d6
| 48240 || 2001 NE || — || July 8, 2001 || Palomar || NEAT || — || align=right | 5.8 km || 
|-id=241 bgcolor=#d6d6d6
| 48241 ||  || — || July 13, 2001 || Haleakala || NEAT || — || align=right | 10 km || 
|-id=242 bgcolor=#d6d6d6
| 48242 ||  || — || August 2, 2001 || Haleakala || NEAT || EOS || align=right | 9.2 km || 
|-id=243 bgcolor=#E9E9E9
| 48243 ||  || — || August 11, 2001 || Ondřejov || P. Kušnirák || ADE || align=right | 6.8 km || 
|-id=244 bgcolor=#d6d6d6
| 48244 ||  || — || August 11, 2001 || Palomar || NEAT || — || align=right | 6.1 km || 
|-id=245 bgcolor=#d6d6d6
| 48245 ||  || — || August 11, 2001 || Haleakala || NEAT || — || align=right | 7.8 km || 
|-id=246 bgcolor=#d6d6d6
| 48246 ||  || — || August 17, 2001 || Socorro || LINEAR || — || align=right | 6.9 km || 
|-id=247 bgcolor=#E9E9E9
| 48247 ||  || — || August 18, 2001 || Socorro || LINEAR || — || align=right | 2.1 km || 
|-id=248 bgcolor=#d6d6d6
| 48248 ||  || — || September 10, 2001 || Socorro || LINEAR || — || align=right | 5.8 km || 
|-id=249 bgcolor=#C2FFFF
| 48249 ||  || — || September 23, 2001 || Haleakala || NEAT || L5 || align=right | 19 km || 
|-id=250 bgcolor=#d6d6d6
| 48250 ||  || — || October 11, 2001 || Socorro || LINEAR || EOS || align=right | 5.2 km || 
|-id=251 bgcolor=#E9E9E9
| 48251 ||  || — || October 14, 2001 || Socorro || LINEAR || — || align=right | 2.9 km || 
|-id=252 bgcolor=#C2FFFF
| 48252 ||  || — || October 13, 2001 || Palomar || NEAT || L5 || align=right | 19 km || 
|-id=253 bgcolor=#d6d6d6
| 48253 ||  || — || October 17, 2001 || Socorro || LINEAR || — || align=right | 9.6 km || 
|-id=254 bgcolor=#C2FFFF
| 48254 ||  || — || October 20, 2001 || Socorro || LINEAR || L5 || align=right | 21 km || 
|-id=255 bgcolor=#E9E9E9
| 48255 ||  || — || November 9, 2001 || Socorro || LINEAR || HEN || align=right | 4.4 km || 
|-id=256 bgcolor=#fefefe
| 48256 ||  || — || November 9, 2001 || Socorro || LINEAR || NYS || align=right | 2.2 km || 
|-id=257 bgcolor=#E9E9E9
| 48257 ||  || — || November 15, 2001 || Socorro || LINEAR || MAR || align=right | 2.9 km || 
|-id=258 bgcolor=#E9E9E9
| 48258 ||  || — || November 17, 2001 || Socorro || LINEAR || — || align=right | 2.8 km || 
|-id=259 bgcolor=#fefefe
| 48259 ||  || — || November 17, 2001 || Socorro || LINEAR || — || align=right | 2.5 km || 
|-id=260 bgcolor=#E9E9E9
| 48260 ||  || — || December 10, 2001 || Socorro || LINEAR || — || align=right | 6.7 km || 
|-id=261 bgcolor=#fefefe
| 48261 ||  || — || December 10, 2001 || Socorro || LINEAR || FLO || align=right | 2.3 km || 
|-id=262 bgcolor=#E9E9E9
| 48262 ||  || — || December 13, 2001 || Socorro || LINEAR || — || align=right | 6.2 km || 
|-id=263 bgcolor=#E9E9E9
| 48263 ||  || — || December 14, 2001 || Socorro || LINEAR || AGN || align=right | 2.4 km || 
|-id=264 bgcolor=#fefefe
| 48264 ||  || — || December 11, 2001 || Socorro || LINEAR || — || align=right | 2.7 km || 
|-id=265 bgcolor=#d6d6d6
| 48265 ||  || — || December 17, 2001 || Socorro || LINEAR || THM || align=right | 6.1 km || 
|-id=266 bgcolor=#E9E9E9
| 48266 ||  || — || December 18, 2001 || Socorro || LINEAR || EUN || align=right | 4.2 km || 
|-id=267 bgcolor=#E9E9E9
| 48267 ||  || — || December 18, 2001 || Socorro || LINEAR || — || align=right | 2.2 km || 
|-id=268 bgcolor=#E9E9E9
| 48268 ||  || — || January 4, 2002 || Asiago || ADAS || EUN || align=right | 4.9 km || 
|-id=269 bgcolor=#C2FFFF
| 48269 ||  || — || January 13, 2002 || Socorro || LINEAR || L4 || align=right | 22 km || 
|-id=270 bgcolor=#E9E9E9
| 48270 ||  || — || February 7, 2002 || Socorro || LINEAR || — || align=right | 5.1 km || 
|-id=271 bgcolor=#fefefe
| 48271 ||  || — || February 7, 2002 || Socorro || LINEAR || NYS || align=right | 1.9 km || 
|-id=272 bgcolor=#d6d6d6
| 48272 ||  || — || February 8, 2002 || Socorro || LINEAR || — || align=right | 5.5 km || 
|-id=273 bgcolor=#fefefe
| 48273 ||  || — || February 12, 2002 || Kitt Peak || Spacewatch || FLO || align=right | 1.7 km || 
|-id=274 bgcolor=#E9E9E9
| 48274 ||  || — || February 10, 2002 || Haleakala || NEAT || — || align=right | 4.3 km || 
|-id=275 bgcolor=#E9E9E9
| 48275 ||  || — || February 11, 2002 || Socorro || LINEAR || MAR || align=right | 3.4 km || 
|-id=276 bgcolor=#fefefe
| 48276 ||  || — || March 9, 2002 || Socorro || LINEAR || — || align=right | 2.2 km || 
|-id=277 bgcolor=#fefefe
| 48277 ||  || — || March 10, 2002 || Anderson Mesa || LONEOS || V || align=right | 1.8 km || 
|-id=278 bgcolor=#fefefe
| 48278 ||  || — || March 13, 2002 || Socorro || LINEAR || NYS || align=right | 4.0 km || 
|-id=279 bgcolor=#E9E9E9
| 48279 ||  || — || March 13, 2002 || Socorro || LINEAR || AGN || align=right | 2.8 km || 
|-id=280 bgcolor=#d6d6d6
| 48280 ||  || — || March 9, 2002 || Socorro || LINEAR || HYG || align=right | 6.0 km || 
|-id=281 bgcolor=#fefefe
| 48281 ||  || — || March 15, 2002 || Kitt Peak || Spacewatch || MAS || align=right | 1.4 km || 
|-id=282 bgcolor=#E9E9E9
| 48282 ||  || — || March 19, 2002 || Socorro || LINEAR || — || align=right | 5.5 km || 
|-id=283 bgcolor=#fefefe
| 48283 ||  || — || April 14, 2002 || Socorro || LINEAR || — || align=right | 3.1 km || 
|-id=284 bgcolor=#E9E9E9
| 48284 ||  || — || April 8, 2002 || Kitt Peak || Spacewatch || AST || align=right | 4.8 km || 
|-id=285 bgcolor=#E9E9E9
| 48285 ||  || — || April 9, 2002 || Socorro || LINEAR || — || align=right | 5.2 km || 
|-id=286 bgcolor=#E9E9E9
| 48286 ||  || — || April 9, 2002 || Socorro || LINEAR || — || align=right | 5.6 km || 
|-id=287 bgcolor=#fefefe
| 48287 ||  || — || April 9, 2002 || Socorro || LINEAR || V || align=right | 1.7 km || 
|-id=288 bgcolor=#fefefe
| 48288 ||  || — || April 17, 2002 || Socorro || LINEAR || — || align=right | 5.3 km || 
|-id=289 bgcolor=#E9E9E9
| 48289 ||  || — || April 17, 2002 || Socorro || LINEAR || — || align=right | 4.3 km || 
|-id=290 bgcolor=#fefefe
| 48290 || 2002 JH || — || May 3, 2002 || Desert Eagle || W. K. Y. Yeung || — || align=right | 2.5 km || 
|-id=291 bgcolor=#fefefe
| 48291 ||  || — || May 4, 2002 || Desert Eagle || W. K. Y. Yeung || fast? || align=right | 2.0 km || 
|-id=292 bgcolor=#fefefe
| 48292 ||  || — || May 8, 2002 || Socorro || LINEAR || — || align=right | 2.4 km || 
|-id=293 bgcolor=#fefefe
| 48293 ||  || — || May 9, 2002 || Socorro || LINEAR || PHO || align=right | 3.0 km || 
|-id=294 bgcolor=#fefefe
| 48294 ||  || — || May 8, 2002 || Haleakala || NEAT || V || align=right | 1.6 km || 
|-id=295 bgcolor=#fefefe
| 48295 ||  || — || May 27, 2002 || Palomar || NEAT || PHO || align=right | 3.3 km || 
|-id=296 bgcolor=#d6d6d6
| 48296 ||  || — || June 6, 2002 || Socorro || LINEAR || LUT || align=right | 12 km || 
|-id=297 bgcolor=#E9E9E9
| 48297 ||  || — || June 9, 2002 || Desert Eagle || W. K. Y. Yeung || EUN || align=right | 2.8 km || 
|-id=298 bgcolor=#E9E9E9
| 48298 ||  || — || June 5, 2002 || Palomar || NEAT || — || align=right | 4.2 km || 
|-id=299 bgcolor=#E9E9E9
| 48299 ||  || — || June 11, 2002 || Fountain Hills || C. W. Juels, P. R. Holvorcem || — || align=right | 2.6 km || 
|-id=300 bgcolor=#d6d6d6
| 48300 Kronk ||  ||  || June 11, 2002 || Fountain Hills || C. W. Juels, P. R. Holvorcem || EOS || align=right | 8.0 km || 
|}

48301–48400 

|-bgcolor=#E9E9E9
| 48301 ||  || — || June 12, 2002 || Fountain Hills || C. W. Juels, P. R. Holvorcem || INO || align=right | 3.9 km || 
|-id=302 bgcolor=#d6d6d6
| 48302 ||  || — || June 9, 2002 || Socorro || LINEAR || URS || align=right | 11 km || 
|-id=303 bgcolor=#fefefe
| 48303 ||  || — || June 10, 2002 || Socorro || LINEAR || — || align=right | 1.9 km || 
|-id=304 bgcolor=#d6d6d6
| 48304 ||  || — || June 11, 2002 || Socorro || LINEAR || — || align=right | 10 km || 
|-id=305 bgcolor=#E9E9E9
| 48305 ||  || — || June 12, 2002 || Socorro || LINEAR || — || align=right | 2.6 km || 
|-id=306 bgcolor=#E9E9E9
| 48306 ||  || — || June 14, 2002 || Socorro || LINEAR || — || align=right | 4.1 km || 
|-id=307 bgcolor=#d6d6d6
| 48307 ||  || — || June 9, 2002 || Socorro || LINEAR || — || align=right | 11 km || 
|-id=308 bgcolor=#E9E9E9
| 48308 ||  || — || June 9, 2002 || Haleakala || NEAT || GEF || align=right | 3.8 km || 
|-id=309 bgcolor=#E9E9E9
| 48309 ||  || — || June 10, 2002 || Socorro || LINEAR || — || align=right | 4.6 km || 
|-id=310 bgcolor=#E9E9E9
| 48310 ||  || — || July 4, 2002 || Palomar || NEAT || — || align=right | 6.4 km || 
|-id=311 bgcolor=#d6d6d6
| 48311 ||  || — || July 5, 2002 || Palomar || NEAT || THM || align=right | 7.4 km || 
|-id=312 bgcolor=#d6d6d6
| 48312 ||  || — || July 8, 2002 || Palomar || NEAT || KAR || align=right | 2.8 km || 
|-id=313 bgcolor=#fefefe
| 48313 ||  || — || July 4, 2002 || Palomar || NEAT || NYS || align=right | 1.4 km || 
|-id=314 bgcolor=#E9E9E9
| 48314 ||  || — || July 4, 2002 || Palomar || NEAT || AEO || align=right | 3.5 km || 
|-id=315 bgcolor=#E9E9E9
| 48315 ||  || — || July 5, 2002 || Socorro || LINEAR || — || align=right | 3.1 km || 
|-id=316 bgcolor=#E9E9E9
| 48316 ||  || — || July 9, 2002 || Socorro || LINEAR || — || align=right | 2.1 km || 
|-id=317 bgcolor=#d6d6d6
| 48317 ||  || — || July 9, 2002 || Socorro || LINEAR || HYG || align=right | 8.0 km || 
|-id=318 bgcolor=#fefefe
| 48318 ||  || — || July 9, 2002 || Socorro || LINEAR || — || align=right | 1.8 km || 
|-id=319 bgcolor=#E9E9E9
| 48319 ||  || — || July 9, 2002 || Socorro || LINEAR || — || align=right | 2.6 km || 
|-id=320 bgcolor=#d6d6d6
| 48320 ||  || — || July 9, 2002 || Socorro || LINEAR || — || align=right | 5.0 km || 
|-id=321 bgcolor=#E9E9E9
| 48321 ||  || — || July 13, 2002 || Socorro || LINEAR || — || align=right | 3.2 km || 
|-id=322 bgcolor=#d6d6d6
| 48322 ||  || — || July 13, 2002 || Socorro || LINEAR || — || align=right | 5.5 km || 
|-id=323 bgcolor=#fefefe
| 48323 ||  || — || July 14, 2002 || Socorro || LINEAR || — || align=right | 3.6 km || 
|-id=324 bgcolor=#d6d6d6
| 48324 ||  || — || July 14, 2002 || Palomar || NEAT || — || align=right | 6.5 km || 
|-id=325 bgcolor=#fefefe
| 48325 ||  || — || July 15, 2002 || Palomar || NEAT || NYS || align=right | 1.4 km || 
|-id=326 bgcolor=#E9E9E9
| 48326 ||  || — || July 13, 2002 || Haleakala || NEAT || — || align=right | 4.7 km || 
|-id=327 bgcolor=#E9E9E9
| 48327 ||  || — || July 13, 2002 || Haleakala || NEAT || — || align=right | 4.8 km || 
|-id=328 bgcolor=#E9E9E9
| 48328 ||  || — || July 14, 2002 || Palomar || NEAT || HEN || align=right | 2.1 km || 
|-id=329 bgcolor=#fefefe
| 48329 ||  || — || July 5, 2002 || Socorro || LINEAR || — || align=right | 1.7 km || 
|-id=330 bgcolor=#E9E9E9
| 48330 ||  || — || July 12, 2002 || Palomar || NEAT || — || align=right | 2.1 km || 
|-id=331 bgcolor=#d6d6d6
| 48331 ||  || — || July 9, 2002 || Socorro || LINEAR || — || align=right | 6.8 km || 
|-id=332 bgcolor=#E9E9E9
| 48332 ||  || — || July 17, 2002 || Socorro || LINEAR || — || align=right | 3.5 km || 
|-id=333 bgcolor=#d6d6d6
| 48333 ||  || — || July 20, 2002 || Palomar || NEAT || — || align=right | 9.8 km || 
|-id=334 bgcolor=#fefefe
| 48334 ||  || — || July 19, 2002 || Palomar || NEAT || — || align=right | 1.8 km || 
|-id=335 bgcolor=#E9E9E9
| 48335 ||  || — || August 4, 2002 || Socorro || LINEAR || — || align=right | 3.5 km || 
|-id=336 bgcolor=#fefefe
| 48336 ||  || — || August 6, 2002 || Socorro || LINEAR || H || align=right | 1.5 km || 
|-id=337 bgcolor=#E9E9E9
| 48337 ||  || — || August 5, 2002 || Reedy Creek || J. Broughton || — || align=right | 2.7 km || 
|-id=338 bgcolor=#FA8072
| 48338 ||  || — || August 6, 2002 || Palomar || NEAT || — || align=right | 2.8 km || 
|-id=339 bgcolor=#d6d6d6
| 48339 ||  || — || August 6, 2002 || Palomar || NEAT || HYG || align=right | 8.7 km || 
|-id=340 bgcolor=#fefefe
| 48340 ||  || — || August 6, 2002 || Palomar || NEAT || NYS || align=right | 2.2 km || 
|-id=341 bgcolor=#fefefe
| 48341 ||  || — || August 10, 2002 || Socorro || LINEAR || — || align=right | 1.9 km || 
|-id=342 bgcolor=#d6d6d6
| 48342 ||  || — || August 8, 2002 || Palomar || NEAT || 3:2 || align=right | 8.0 km || 
|-id=343 bgcolor=#d6d6d6
| 48343 || 2180 P-L || — || September 24, 1960 || Palomar || PLS || — || align=right | 4.4 km || 
|-id=344 bgcolor=#fefefe
| 48344 || 2588 P-L || — || September 24, 1960 || Palomar || PLS || — || align=right | 2.7 km || 
|-id=345 bgcolor=#fefefe
| 48345 || 2662 P-L || — || September 24, 1960 || Palomar || PLS || — || align=right | 2.3 km || 
|-id=346 bgcolor=#E9E9E9
| 48346 || 3077 P-L || — || September 25, 1960 || Palomar || PLS || — || align=right | 5.1 km || 
|-id=347 bgcolor=#fefefe
| 48347 || 3567 P-L || — || October 22, 1960 || Palomar || PLS || V || align=right | 2.1 km || 
|-id=348 bgcolor=#E9E9E9
| 48348 || 4124 P-L || — || September 24, 1960 || Palomar || PLS || GEF || align=right | 4.3 km || 
|-id=349 bgcolor=#d6d6d6
| 48349 || 4239 P-L || — || September 24, 1960 || Palomar || PLS || — || align=right | 6.7 km || 
|-id=350 bgcolor=#fefefe
| 48350 || 6221 P-L || — || September 24, 1960 || Palomar || PLS || V || align=right | 2.5 km || 
|-id=351 bgcolor=#fefefe
| 48351 || 6250 P-L || — || September 24, 1960 || Palomar || PLS || — || align=right | 1.5 km || 
|-id=352 bgcolor=#d6d6d6
| 48352 || 6320 P-L || — || September 24, 1960 || Palomar || PLS || TEL || align=right | 4.6 km || 
|-id=353 bgcolor=#E9E9E9
| 48353 || 6616 P-L || — || September 24, 1960 || Palomar || PLS || — || align=right | 6.7 km || 
|-id=354 bgcolor=#E9E9E9
| 48354 || 1291 T-1 || — || March 25, 1971 || Palomar || PLS || ADE || align=right | 4.3 km || 
|-id=355 bgcolor=#fefefe
| 48355 || 2184 T-1 || — || March 25, 1971 || Palomar || PLS || — || align=right | 1.8 km || 
|-id=356 bgcolor=#E9E9E9
| 48356 || 3118 T-1 || — || March 26, 1971 || Palomar || PLS || MIT || align=right | 4.5 km || 
|-id=357 bgcolor=#fefefe
| 48357 || 1013 T-2 || — || September 29, 1973 || Palomar || PLS || — || align=right | 1.7 km || 
|-id=358 bgcolor=#E9E9E9
| 48358 || 1187 T-2 || — || September 29, 1973 || Palomar || PLS || — || align=right | 1.5 km || 
|-id=359 bgcolor=#fefefe
| 48359 || 1219 T-2 || — || September 29, 1973 || Palomar || PLS || — || align=right data-sort-value="0.87" | 870 m || 
|-id=360 bgcolor=#fefefe
| 48360 || 1262 T-2 || — || September 29, 1973 || Palomar || PLS || — || align=right | 1.7 km || 
|-id=361 bgcolor=#fefefe
| 48361 || 2022 T-2 || — || September 29, 1973 || Palomar || PLS || V || align=right | 1.7 km || 
|-id=362 bgcolor=#fefefe
| 48362 || 2184 T-2 || — || September 29, 1973 || Palomar || PLS || NYSfast || align=right | 1.4 km || 
|-id=363 bgcolor=#fefefe
| 48363 || 2192 T-2 || — || September 29, 1973 || Palomar || PLS || — || align=right | 1.8 km || 
|-id=364 bgcolor=#fefefe
| 48364 || 3096 T-2 || — || September 30, 1973 || Palomar || PLS || V || align=right | 2.1 km || 
|-id=365 bgcolor=#E9E9E9
| 48365 || 3106 T-2 || — || September 30, 1973 || Palomar || PLS || EUN || align=right | 4.2 km || 
|-id=366 bgcolor=#fefefe
| 48366 || 3284 T-2 || — || September 30, 1973 || Palomar || PLS || ERI || align=right | 5.4 km || 
|-id=367 bgcolor=#fefefe
| 48367 || 4127 T-2 || — || September 29, 1973 || Palomar || PLS || — || align=right | 2.3 km || 
|-id=368 bgcolor=#E9E9E9
| 48368 || 4141 T-2 || — || September 29, 1973 || Palomar || PLS || — || align=right | 3.3 km || 
|-id=369 bgcolor=#d6d6d6
| 48369 || 4153 T-2 || — || September 29, 1973 || Palomar || PLS || KAR || align=right | 3.2 km || 
|-id=370 bgcolor=#E9E9E9
| 48370 || 1056 T-3 || — || October 17, 1977 || Palomar || PLS || — || align=right | 3.5 km || 
|-id=371 bgcolor=#E9E9E9
| 48371 || 1173 T-3 || — || October 17, 1977 || Palomar || PLS || — || align=right | 5.2 km || 
|-id=372 bgcolor=#d6d6d6
| 48372 || 1182 T-3 || — || October 17, 1977 || Palomar || PLS || EOS || align=right | 4.9 km || 
|-id=373 bgcolor=#C2FFFF
| 48373 Gorgythion || 2161 T-3 ||  || October 16, 1977 || Palomar || PLS || L5ENM || align=right | 20 km || 
|-id=374 bgcolor=#E9E9E9
| 48374 || 2583 T-3 || — || October 17, 1977 || Palomar || PLS || EUN || align=right | 3.0 km || 
|-id=375 bgcolor=#E9E9E9
| 48375 || 3320 T-3 || — || October 16, 1977 || Palomar || PLS || — || align=right | 3.1 km || 
|-id=376 bgcolor=#fefefe
| 48376 || 4044 T-3 || — || October 16, 1977 || Palomar || PLS || Vslow || align=right | 2.8 km || 
|-id=377 bgcolor=#fefefe
| 48377 || 4047 T-3 || — || October 16, 1977 || Palomar || PLS || ERI || align=right | 3.3 km || 
|-id=378 bgcolor=#fefefe
| 48378 || 4241 T-3 || — || October 16, 1977 || Palomar || PLS || ERI || align=right | 5.0 km || 
|-id=379 bgcolor=#E9E9E9
| 48379 || 4672 T-3 || — || October 17, 1977 || Palomar || PLS || — || align=right | 4.3 km || 
|-id=380 bgcolor=#E9E9E9
| 48380 || 5622 T-3 || — || October 16, 1977 || Palomar || PLS || — || align=right | 2.6 km || 
|-id=381 bgcolor=#fefefe
| 48381 ||  || — || September 17, 1977 || Siding Spring || A. Boattini, G. Forti || H || align=right | 1.9 km || 
|-id=382 bgcolor=#fefefe
| 48382 ||  || — || October 27, 1978 || Palomar || C. M. Olmstead || FLO || align=right | 1.9 km || 
|-id=383 bgcolor=#fefefe
| 48383 ||  || — || November 6, 1978 || Palomar || E. F. Helin, S. J. Bus || — || align=right | 2.0 km || 
|-id=384 bgcolor=#E9E9E9
| 48384 ||  || — || November 7, 1978 || Palomar || E. F. Helin, S. J. Bus || — || align=right | 3.0 km || 
|-id=385 bgcolor=#E9E9E9
| 48385 ||  || — || November 7, 1978 || Palomar || E. F. Helin, S. J. Bus || — || align=right | 2.7 km || 
|-id=386 bgcolor=#E9E9E9
| 48386 ||  || — || June 25, 1979 || Siding Spring || E. F. Helin, S. J. Bus || EUN || align=right | 3.8 km || 
|-id=387 bgcolor=#fefefe
| 48387 ||  || — || June 25, 1979 || Siding Spring || E. F. Helin, S. J. Bus || V || align=right | 1.5 km || 
|-id=388 bgcolor=#E9E9E9
| 48388 ||  || — || June 25, 1979 || Siding Spring || E. F. Helin, S. J. Bus || — || align=right | 2.4 km || 
|-id=389 bgcolor=#fefefe
| 48389 ||  || — || June 25, 1979 || Siding Spring || E. F. Helin, S. J. Bus || — || align=right | 1.9 km || 
|-id=390 bgcolor=#d6d6d6
| 48390 ||  || — || July 24, 1979 || Palomar || S. J. Bus || HYG || align=right | 5.2 km || 
|-id=391 bgcolor=#E9E9E9
| 48391 ||  || — || February 28, 1981 || Siding Spring || S. J. Bus || — || align=right | 6.8 km || 
|-id=392 bgcolor=#fefefe
| 48392 ||  || — || February 28, 1981 || Siding Spring || S. J. Bus || PHO || align=right | 2.7 km || 
|-id=393 bgcolor=#E9E9E9
| 48393 ||  || — || March 2, 1981 || Siding Spring || S. J. Bus || — || align=right | 6.0 km || 
|-id=394 bgcolor=#fefefe
| 48394 ||  || — || March 1, 1981 || Siding Spring || S. J. Bus || V || align=right | 2.2 km || 
|-id=395 bgcolor=#fefefe
| 48395 ||  || — || March 7, 1981 || Siding Spring || S. J. Bus || — || align=right | 2.5 km || 
|-id=396 bgcolor=#fefefe
| 48396 ||  || — || March 1, 1981 || Siding Spring || S. J. Bus || FLO || align=right | 2.5 km || 
|-id=397 bgcolor=#fefefe
| 48397 ||  || — || March 6, 1981 || Siding Spring || S. J. Bus || — || align=right | 3.3 km || 
|-id=398 bgcolor=#E9E9E9
| 48398 ||  || — || March 2, 1981 || Siding Spring || S. J. Bus || — || align=right | 5.5 km || 
|-id=399 bgcolor=#E9E9E9
| 48399 ||  || — || March 2, 1981 || Siding Spring || S. J. Bus || — || align=right | 5.7 km || 
|-id=400 bgcolor=#d6d6d6
| 48400 ||  || — || March 2, 1981 || Siding Spring || S. J. Bus || KOR || align=right | 3.3 km || 
|}

48401–48500 

|-bgcolor=#E9E9E9
| 48401 ||  || — || March 2, 1981 || Siding Spring || S. J. Bus || DOR || align=right | 7.6 km || 
|-id=402 bgcolor=#fefefe
| 48402 ||  || — || March 2, 1981 || Siding Spring || S. J. Bus || — || align=right | 5.8 km || 
|-id=403 bgcolor=#fefefe
| 48403 ||  || — || March 2, 1981 || Siding Spring || S. J. Bus || NYS || align=right | 1.7 km || 
|-id=404 bgcolor=#E9E9E9
| 48404 ||  || — || March 2, 1981 || Siding Spring || S. J. Bus || — || align=right | 9.1 km || 
|-id=405 bgcolor=#E9E9E9
| 48405 ||  || — || March 2, 1981 || Siding Spring || S. J. Bus || — || align=right | 6.3 km || 
|-id=406 bgcolor=#fefefe
| 48406 ||  || — || March 2, 1981 || Siding Spring || S. J. Bus || — || align=right | 2.7 km || 
|-id=407 bgcolor=#fefefe
| 48407 ||  || — || August 27, 1981 || La Silla || H. Debehogne || FLO || align=right | 3.5 km || 
|-id=408 bgcolor=#E9E9E9
| 48408 ||  || — || November 14, 1982 || Kiso || H. Kosai, K. Furukawa || EUN || align=right | 4.2 km || 
|-id=409 bgcolor=#E9E9E9
| 48409 ||  || — || September 27, 1984 || Palomar || D. Padgett || — || align=right | 4.6 km || 
|-id=410 bgcolor=#d6d6d6
| 48410 Kolmogorov ||  ||  || August 23, 1985 || Nauchnij || N. S. Chernykh || — || align=right | 11 km || 
|-id=411 bgcolor=#E9E9E9
| 48411 Johnventre ||  ||  || September 5, 1985 || La Silla || H. Debehogne || — || align=right | 3.7 km || 
|-id=412 bgcolor=#d6d6d6
| 48412 ||  || — || August 27, 1986 || La Silla || H. Debehogne || — || align=right | 10 km || 
|-id=413 bgcolor=#d6d6d6
| 48413 ||  || — || October 9, 1986 || Piwnice || M. Antal || EOS || align=right | 7.8 km || 
|-id=414 bgcolor=#fefefe
| 48414 || 1987 OS || — || July 19, 1987 || Palomar || E. F. Helin || — || align=right | 2.2 km || 
|-id=415 bgcolor=#fefefe
| 48415 Dehio || 1987 QT ||  || August 21, 1987 || Tautenburg Observatory || F. Börngen || — || align=right | 5.5 km || 
|-id=416 bgcolor=#d6d6d6
| 48416 Carmelita ||  ||  || January 24, 1988 || Palomar || C. S. Shoemaker, E. M. Shoemaker || — || align=right | 12 km || 
|-id=417 bgcolor=#d6d6d6
| 48417 ||  || — || February 11, 1988 || La Silla || E. W. Elst || — || align=right | 6.8 km || 
|-id=418 bgcolor=#E9E9E9
| 48418 ||  || — || March 13, 1988 || Brorfelde || P. Jensen || JUN || align=right | 6.4 km || 
|-id=419 bgcolor=#fefefe
| 48419 ||  || — || September 2, 1988 || La Silla || H. Debehogne || V || align=right | 2.6 km || 
|-id=420 bgcolor=#E9E9E9
| 48420 ||  || — || September 2, 1988 || La Silla || H. Debehogne || — || align=right | 6.3 km || 
|-id=421 bgcolor=#fefefe
| 48421 || 1988 VF || — || November 3, 1988 || Chiyoda || T. Kojima || — || align=right | 2.7 km || 
|-id=422 bgcolor=#fefefe
| 48422 Schrade ||  ||  || November 3, 1988 || Tautenburg Observatory || F. Börngen || — || align=right | 1.9 km || 
|-id=423 bgcolor=#fefefe
| 48423 || 1988 WA || — || November 17, 1988 || Kushiro || S. Ueda, H. Kaneda || — || align=right | 4.7 km || 
|-id=424 bgcolor=#d6d6d6
| 48424 Souchay ||  ||  || December 5, 1988 || Kiso || T. Nakamura || KOR || align=right | 5.0 km || 
|-id=425 bgcolor=#fefefe
| 48425 Tischendorf ||  ||  || February 2, 1989 || Tautenburg Observatory || F. Börngen || MAS || align=right | 2.0 km || 
|-id=426 bgcolor=#fefefe
| 48426 ||  || — || March 2, 1989 || La Silla || E. W. Elst || V || align=right | 1.8 km || 
|-id=427 bgcolor=#E9E9E9
| 48427 ||  || — || September 26, 1989 || La Silla || E. W. Elst || — || align=right | 4.1 km || 
|-id=428 bgcolor=#E9E9E9
| 48428 ||  || — || September 26, 1989 || La Silla || E. W. Elst || — || align=right | 3.6 km || 
|-id=429 bgcolor=#E9E9E9
| 48429 ||  || — || September 28, 1989 || La Silla || H. Debehogne || — || align=right | 2.5 km || 
|-id=430 bgcolor=#E9E9E9
| 48430 ||  || — || October 7, 1989 || La Silla || E. W. Elst || — || align=right | 6.7 km || 
|-id=431 bgcolor=#E9E9E9
| 48431 ||  || — || October 2, 1989 || Cerro Tololo || S. J. Bus || — || align=right | 3.5 km || 
|-id=432 bgcolor=#E9E9E9
| 48432 ||  || — || October 7, 1989 || La Silla || E. W. Elst || — || align=right | 3.9 km || 
|-id=433 bgcolor=#E9E9E9
| 48433 ||  || — || October 29, 1989 || Kitami || A. Takahashi, K. Watanabe || — || align=right | 13 km || 
|-id=434 bgcolor=#E9E9E9
| 48434 Maxbeckmann ||  ||  || October 23, 1989 || Tautenburg Observatory || F. Börngen || — || align=right | 5.5 km || 
|-id=435 bgcolor=#E9E9E9
| 48435 Jaspers ||  ||  || October 23, 1989 || Tautenburg Observatory || F. Börngen || — || align=right | 6.0 km || 
|-id=436 bgcolor=#E9E9E9
| 48436 || 1989 VK || — || November 2, 1989 || Yorii || M. Arai, H. Mori || — || align=right | 2.8 km || 
|-id=437 bgcolor=#fefefe
| 48437 ||  || — || November 3, 1989 || La Silla || E. W. Elst || FLO || align=right | 1.2 km || 
|-id=438 bgcolor=#C2FFFF
| 48438 ||  || — || November 21, 1989 || Siding Spring || R. H. McNaught || L5 || align=right | 36 km || 
|-id=439 bgcolor=#E9E9E9
| 48439 ||  || — || November 20, 1989 || Kushiro || S. Ueda, H. Kaneda || — || align=right | 10 km || 
|-id=440 bgcolor=#fefefe
| 48440 ||  || — || December 30, 1989 || Siding Spring || R. H. McNaught || FLO || align=right | 2.0 km || 
|-id=441 bgcolor=#fefefe
| 48441 ||  || — || March 2, 1990 || La Silla || E. W. Elst || FLO || align=right | 1.7 km || 
|-id=442 bgcolor=#d6d6d6
| 48442 || 1990 GF || — || April 15, 1990 || La Silla || E. W. Elst || — || align=right | 5.9 km || 
|-id=443 bgcolor=#fefefe
| 48443 ||  || — || April 29, 1990 || Siding Spring || A. Żytkow, M. J. Irwin || NYS || align=right | 1.7 km || 
|-id=444 bgcolor=#d6d6d6
| 48444 ||  || — || August 16, 1990 || La Silla || E. W. Elst || — || align=right | 9.6 km || 
|-id=445 bgcolor=#d6d6d6
| 48445 ||  || — || August 16, 1990 || La Silla || E. W. Elst || — || align=right | 7.9 km || 
|-id=446 bgcolor=#d6d6d6
| 48446 ||  || — || September 14, 1990 || Palomar || H. E. Holt || LIX || align=right | 10 km || 
|-id=447 bgcolor=#d6d6d6
| 48447 Hingley ||  ||  || October 10, 1990 || Tautenburg Observatory || L. D. Schmadel, F. Börngen || URS || align=right | 13 km || 
|-id=448 bgcolor=#E9E9E9
| 48448 ||  || — || November 21, 1990 || Kitami || K. Endate, K. Watanabe || — || align=right | 4.2 km || 
|-id=449 bgcolor=#fefefe
| 48449 ||  || — || March 12, 1991 || La Silla || H. Debehogne || — || align=right | 2.3 km || 
|-id=450 bgcolor=#FA8072
| 48450 || 1991 NA || — || July 7, 1991 || Palomar || E. F. Helin || — || align=right | 2.3 km || 
|-id=451 bgcolor=#d6d6d6
| 48451 Pichincha ||  ||  || August 2, 1991 || La Silla || E. W. Elst || — || align=right | 6.3 km || 
|-id=452 bgcolor=#fefefe
| 48452 ||  || — || August 6, 1991 || La Silla || E. W. Elst || NYS || align=right | 1.5 km || 
|-id=453 bgcolor=#fefefe
| 48453 ||  || — || August 13, 1991 || Palomar || E. F. Helin || — || align=right | 4.3 km || 
|-id=454 bgcolor=#fefefe
| 48454 ||  || — || August 5, 1991 || Palomar || H. E. Holt || NYS || align=right | 1.8 km || 
|-id=455 bgcolor=#fefefe
| 48455 ||  || — || August 5, 1991 || Palomar || H. E. Holt || — || align=right | 2.2 km || 
|-id=456 bgcolor=#d6d6d6
| 48456 Wilhelmwien ||  ||  || September 12, 1991 || Tautenburg Observatory || F. Börngen, L. D. Schmadel || — || align=right | 8.7 km || 
|-id=457 bgcolor=#fefefe
| 48457 Joseffried ||  ||  || September 12, 1991 || Tautenburg Observatory || L. D. Schmadel, F. Börngen || V || align=right | 2.0 km || 
|-id=458 bgcolor=#d6d6d6
| 48458 Merian ||  ||  || September 13, 1991 || Tautenburg Observatory || F. Börngen, L. D. Schmadel || — || align=right | 10 km || 
|-id=459 bgcolor=#fefefe
| 48459 ||  || — || September 13, 1991 || Palomar || H. E. Holt || — || align=right | 2.3 km || 
|-id=460 bgcolor=#fefefe
| 48460 ||  || — || September 13, 1991 || Palomar || H. E. Holt || V || align=right | 2.0 km || 
|-id=461 bgcolor=#fefefe
| 48461 Sabrinamaricia ||  ||  || September 7, 1991 || Palomar || E. F. Helin, S. Cohen || KLI || align=right | 5.5 km || 
|-id=462 bgcolor=#d6d6d6
| 48462 ||  || — || September 3, 1991 || Siding Spring || R. H. McNaught || ALA || align=right | 15 km || 
|-id=463 bgcolor=#fefefe
| 48463 ||  || — || September 13, 1991 || Palomar || H. E. Holt || V || align=right | 2.8 km || 
|-id=464 bgcolor=#fefefe
| 48464 ||  || — || September 15, 1991 || Palomar || H. E. Holt || V || align=right | 2.6 km || 
|-id=465 bgcolor=#d6d6d6
| 48465 ||  || — || September 14, 1991 || Palomar || H. E. Holt || — || align=right | 13 km || 
|-id=466 bgcolor=#fefefe
| 48466 ||  || — || September 12, 1991 || Palomar || H. E. Holt || FLO || align=right | 2.2 km || 
|-id=467 bgcolor=#fefefe
| 48467 ||  || — || September 30, 1991 || Siding Spring || R. H. McNaught || V || align=right | 1.9 km || 
|-id=468 bgcolor=#FA8072
| 48468 ||  || — || September 29, 1991 || Kitt Peak || Spacewatch || — || align=right | 1.5 km || 
|-id=469 bgcolor=#fefefe
| 48469 ||  || — || October 10, 1991 || Palomar || J. Alu || PHO || align=right | 4.8 km || 
|-id=470 bgcolor=#fefefe
| 48470 ||  || — || October 10, 1991 || Palomar || K. J. Lawrence || H || align=right | 3.1 km || 
|-id=471 bgcolor=#fefefe
| 48471 Orchiston ||  ||  || October 7, 1991 || Tautenburg Observatory || L. D. Schmadel, F. Börngen || — || align=right | 2.0 km || 
|-id=472 bgcolor=#fefefe
| 48472 Mössbauer ||  ||  || October 2, 1991 || Tautenburg Observatory || F. Börngen, L. D. Schmadel || — || align=right | 2.4 km || 
|-id=473 bgcolor=#fefefe
| 48473 ||  || — || October 6, 1991 || Kitt Peak || Spacewatch || NYS || align=right | 1.9 km || 
|-id=474 bgcolor=#fefefe
| 48474 || 1991 UR || — || October 18, 1991 || Kushiro || S. Ueda, H. Kaneda || V || align=right | 3.8 km || 
|-id=475 bgcolor=#d6d6d6
| 48475 ||  || — || October 29, 1991 || Kushiro || S. Ueda, H. Kaneda || — || align=right | 9.6 km || 
|-id=476 bgcolor=#fefefe
| 48476 ||  || — || October 31, 1991 || Kushiro || S. Ueda, H. Kaneda || NYS || align=right | 1.8 km || 
|-id=477 bgcolor=#fefefe
| 48477 || 1991 VV || — || November 2, 1991 || Palomar || E. F. Helin || PHO || align=right | 3.8 km || 
|-id=478 bgcolor=#fefefe
| 48478 ||  || — || November 3, 1991 || Palomar || E. F. Helin || — || align=right | 3.4 km || 
|-id=479 bgcolor=#fefefe
| 48479 || 1991 XF || — || December 4, 1991 || Kushiro || S. Ueda, H. Kaneda || — || align=right | 2.8 km || 
|-id=480 bgcolor=#d6d6d6
| 48480 Falk ||  ||  || December 28, 1991 || Tautenburg Observatory || F. Börngen || — || align=right | 4.1 km || 
|-id=481 bgcolor=#fefefe
| 48481 ||  || — || January 28, 1992 || Kitt Peak || Spacewatch || — || align=right | 2.6 km || 
|-id=482 bgcolor=#d6d6d6
| 48482 Oruki || 1992 CN ||  || February 5, 1992 || Geisei || T. Seki || HYG || align=right | 8.1 km || 
|-id=483 bgcolor=#fefefe
| 48483 ||  || — || February 2, 1992 || La Silla || E. W. Elst || — || align=right | 2.8 km || 
|-id=484 bgcolor=#E9E9E9
| 48484 ||  || — || March 11, 1992 || Kitt Peak || A. Dunn || — || align=right | 4.6 km || 
|-id=485 bgcolor=#E9E9E9
| 48485 ||  || — || March 1, 1992 || La Silla || UESAC || EUN || align=right | 2.9 km || 
|-id=486 bgcolor=#fefefe
| 48486 ||  || — || March 1, 1992 || La Silla || UESAC || — || align=right | 1.8 km || 
|-id=487 bgcolor=#E9E9E9
| 48487 ||  || — || March 2, 1992 || La Silla || UESAC || EUN || align=right | 3.4 km || 
|-id=488 bgcolor=#E9E9E9
| 48488 ||  || — || March 6, 1992 || La Silla || UESAC || — || align=right | 3.3 km || 
|-id=489 bgcolor=#E9E9E9
| 48489 ||  || — || March 2, 1992 || La Silla || UESAC || EUN || align=right | 2.9 km || 
|-id=490 bgcolor=#E9E9E9
| 48490 ||  || — || April 4, 1992 || La Silla || E. W. Elst || RAF || align=right | 3.0 km || 
|-id=491 bgcolor=#d6d6d6
| 48491 ||  || — || April 24, 1992 || La Silla || H. Debehogne || TIR || align=right | 6.1 km || 
|-id=492 bgcolor=#d6d6d6
| 48492 Utewielen ||  ||  || September 24, 1992 || Tautenburg Observatory || L. D. Schmadel, F. Börngen || — || align=right | 7.0 km || 
|-id=493 bgcolor=#d6d6d6
| 48493 || 1992 WG || — || November 16, 1992 || Kushiro || S. Ueda, H. Kaneda || EOS || align=right | 6.7 km || 
|-id=494 bgcolor=#fefefe
| 48494 || 1992 WM || — || November 16, 1992 || Kushiro || S. Ueda, H. Kaneda || — || align=right | 3.3 km || 
|-id=495 bgcolor=#fefefe
| 48495 Ryugado || 1993 BB ||  || January 16, 1993 || Geisei || T. Seki || — || align=right | 1.9 km || 
|-id=496 bgcolor=#fefefe
| 48496 ||  || — || January 26, 1993 || Kitt Peak || T. J. Balonek || V || align=right | 2.0 km || 
|-id=497 bgcolor=#fefefe
| 48497 ||  || — || January 27, 1993 || Caussols || E. W. Elst || — || align=right | 2.7 km || 
|-id=498 bgcolor=#d6d6d6
| 48498 ||  || — || January 30, 1993 || Kagoshima || M. Mukai, M. Takeishi || — || align=right | 18 km || 
|-id=499 bgcolor=#d6d6d6
| 48499 ||  || — || January 23, 1993 || La Silla || E. W. Elst || — || align=right | 11 km || 
|-id=500 bgcolor=#d6d6d6
| 48500 ||  || — || February 20, 1993 || Caussols || E. W. Elst || HYG || align=right | 7.9 km || 
|}

48501–48600 

|-bgcolor=#d6d6d6
| 48501 || 1993 FM || — || March 23, 1993 || Lake Tekapo || A. C. Gilmore, P. M. Kilmartin || THM || align=right | 10 km || 
|-id=502 bgcolor=#fefefe
| 48502 ||  || — || March 17, 1993 || La Silla || UESAC || — || align=right | 1.7 km || 
|-id=503 bgcolor=#fefefe
| 48503 ||  || — || March 17, 1993 || La Silla || UESAC || V || align=right | 1.4 km || 
|-id=504 bgcolor=#fefefe
| 48504 ||  || — || March 17, 1993 || La Silla || UESAC || — || align=right | 3.1 km || 
|-id=505 bgcolor=#fefefe
| 48505 ||  || — || March 17, 1993 || La Silla || UESAC || MAS || align=right | 2.0 km || 
|-id=506 bgcolor=#d6d6d6
| 48506 ||  || — || March 17, 1993 || La Silla || UESAC || — || align=right | 7.1 km || 
|-id=507 bgcolor=#fefefe
| 48507 ||  || — || March 17, 1993 || La Silla || UESAC || V || align=right | 3.0 km || 
|-id=508 bgcolor=#d6d6d6
| 48508 ||  || — || March 17, 1993 || La Silla || UESAC || — || align=right | 4.6 km || 
|-id=509 bgcolor=#fefefe
| 48509 ||  || — || March 17, 1993 || La Silla || UESAC || NYS || align=right | 4.3 km || 
|-id=510 bgcolor=#fefefe
| 48510 ||  || — || March 17, 1993 || La Silla || UESAC || V || align=right | 1.5 km || 
|-id=511 bgcolor=#fefefe
| 48511 ||  || — || March 17, 1993 || La Silla || UESAC || — || align=right | 2.5 km || 
|-id=512 bgcolor=#d6d6d6
| 48512 ||  || — || March 17, 1993 || La Silla || UESAC || — || align=right | 8.9 km || 
|-id=513 bgcolor=#fefefe
| 48513 ||  || — || March 21, 1993 || La Silla || UESAC || MAS || align=right | 2.2 km || 
|-id=514 bgcolor=#E9E9E9
| 48514 ||  || — || March 21, 1993 || La Silla || UESAC || — || align=right | 1.9 km || 
|-id=515 bgcolor=#d6d6d6
| 48515 ||  || — || March 21, 1993 || La Silla || UESAC || HYG || align=right | 7.2 km || 
|-id=516 bgcolor=#d6d6d6
| 48516 ||  || — || March 21, 1993 || La Silla || UESAC || THB || align=right | 9.1 km || 
|-id=517 bgcolor=#fefefe
| 48517 ||  || — || March 21, 1993 || La Silla || UESAC || NYS || align=right | 2.0 km || 
|-id=518 bgcolor=#fefefe
| 48518 ||  || — || March 21, 1993 || La Silla || UESAC || — || align=right | 3.0 km || 
|-id=519 bgcolor=#fefefe
| 48519 ||  || — || March 19, 1993 || La Silla || UESAC || — || align=right | 2.3 km || 
|-id=520 bgcolor=#fefefe
| 48520 ||  || — || March 19, 1993 || La Silla || UESAC || — || align=right | 1.9 km || 
|-id=521 bgcolor=#fefefe
| 48521 ||  || — || March 19, 1993 || La Silla || UESAC || NYS || align=right | 1.5 km || 
|-id=522 bgcolor=#d6d6d6
| 48522 ||  || — || March 17, 1993 || La Silla || UESAC || — || align=right | 10 km || 
|-id=523 bgcolor=#E9E9E9
| 48523 ||  || — || March 17, 1993 || La Silla || UESAC || — || align=right | 1.8 km || 
|-id=524 bgcolor=#d6d6d6
| 48524 ||  || — || March 21, 1993 || La Silla || UESAC || — || align=right | 7.5 km || 
|-id=525 bgcolor=#fefefe
| 48525 || 1993 GB || — || April 14, 1993 || Kiyosato || S. Otomo || — || align=right | 4.9 km || 
|-id=526 bgcolor=#fefefe
| 48526 ||  || — || April 20, 1993 || Kitt Peak || Spacewatch || NYS || align=right | 2.1 km || 
|-id=527 bgcolor=#fefefe
| 48527 ||  || — || June 13, 1993 || Siding Spring || R. H. McNaught || H || align=right | 1.3 km || 
|-id=528 bgcolor=#E9E9E9
| 48528 ||  || — || July 20, 1993 || La Silla || E. W. Elst || — || align=right | 3.6 km || 
|-id=529 bgcolor=#d6d6d6
| 48529 von Wrangel ||  ||  || July 20, 1993 || La Silla || E. W. Elst || 3:2 || align=right | 9.9 km || 
|-id=530 bgcolor=#E9E9E9
| 48530 || 1993 PF || — || August 12, 1993 || Farra d'Isonzo || Farra d'Isonzo || — || align=right | 4.0 km || 
|-id=531 bgcolor=#E9E9E9
| 48531 || 1993 PP || — || August 13, 1993 || Kitt Peak || Spacewatch || — || align=right | 2.3 km || 
|-id=532 bgcolor=#E9E9E9
| 48532 ||  || — || August 15, 1993 || Caussols || E. W. Elst || EUN || align=right | 3.1 km || 
|-id=533 bgcolor=#E9E9E9
| 48533 || 1993 QU || — || August 19, 1993 || Palomar || E. F. Helin || — || align=right | 6.3 km || 
|-id=534 bgcolor=#E9E9E9
| 48534 ||  || — || August 18, 1993 || Caussols || E. W. Elst || HEN || align=right | 3.3 km || 
|-id=535 bgcolor=#E9E9E9
| 48535 ||  || — || September 15, 1993 || La Silla || E. W. Elst || — || align=right | 4.1 km || 
|-id=536 bgcolor=#E9E9E9
| 48536 ||  || — || September 15, 1993 || La Silla || E. W. Elst || — || align=right | 3.2 km || 
|-id=537 bgcolor=#E9E9E9
| 48537 ||  || — || September 15, 1993 || La Silla || E. W. Elst || — || align=right | 3.6 km || 
|-id=538 bgcolor=#E9E9E9
| 48538 ||  || — || September 15, 1993 || La Silla || H. Debehogne, E. W. Elst || — || align=right | 3.6 km || 
|-id=539 bgcolor=#E9E9E9
| 48539 ||  || — || September 22, 1993 || La Silla || H. Debehogne, E. W. Elst || — || align=right | 6.2 km || 
|-id=540 bgcolor=#E9E9E9
| 48540 ||  || — || October 11, 1993 || Kitt Peak || Spacewatch || JUN || align=right | 6.0 km || 
|-id=541 bgcolor=#E9E9E9
| 48541 ||  || — || October 15, 1993 || Kitt Peak || Spacewatch || ADE || align=right | 9.1 km || 
|-id=542 bgcolor=#E9E9E9
| 48542 ||  || — || October 14, 1993 || Palomar || H. E. Holt || — || align=right | 6.2 km || 
|-id=543 bgcolor=#E9E9E9
| 48543 ||  || — || October 9, 1993 || La Silla || E. W. Elst || GEF || align=right | 5.1 km || 
|-id=544 bgcolor=#E9E9E9
| 48544 ||  || — || October 9, 1993 || La Silla || E. W. Elst || — || align=right | 6.8 km || 
|-id=545 bgcolor=#E9E9E9
| 48545 ||  || — || October 9, 1993 || La Silla || E. W. Elst || NEM || align=right | 4.1 km || 
|-id=546 bgcolor=#E9E9E9
| 48546 ||  || — || October 9, 1993 || La Silla || E. W. Elst || AGN || align=right | 3.0 km || 
|-id=547 bgcolor=#E9E9E9
| 48547 ||  || — || October 9, 1993 || La Silla || E. W. Elst || — || align=right | 3.2 km || 
|-id=548 bgcolor=#E9E9E9
| 48548 ||  || — || October 9, 1993 || La Silla || E. W. Elst || — || align=right | 5.3 km || 
|-id=549 bgcolor=#E9E9E9
| 48549 ||  || — || October 9, 1993 || La Silla || E. W. Elst || — || align=right | 5.4 km || 
|-id=550 bgcolor=#E9E9E9
| 48550 ||  || — || October 9, 1993 || La Silla || E. W. Elst || PAD || align=right | 8.0 km || 
|-id=551 bgcolor=#E9E9E9
| 48551 ||  || — || October 9, 1993 || La Silla || E. W. Elst || — || align=right | 3.3 km || 
|-id=552 bgcolor=#E9E9E9
| 48552 ||  || — || October 9, 1993 || La Silla || E. W. Elst || GEF || align=right | 3.1 km || 
|-id=553 bgcolor=#E9E9E9
| 48553 ||  || — || October 9, 1993 || La Silla || E. W. Elst || AGN || align=right | 2.6 km || 
|-id=554 bgcolor=#E9E9E9
| 48554 ||  || — || October 9, 1993 || La Silla || E. W. Elst || — || align=right | 3.2 km || 
|-id=555 bgcolor=#E9E9E9
| 48555 ||  || — || October 9, 1993 || La Silla || E. W. Elst || HEN || align=right | 2.7 km || 
|-id=556 bgcolor=#E9E9E9
| 48556 ||  || — || October 9, 1993 || La Silla || E. W. Elst || — || align=right | 8.4 km || 
|-id=557 bgcolor=#E9E9E9
| 48557 ||  || — || October 9, 1993 || La Silla || E. W. Elst || — || align=right | 5.4 km || 
|-id=558 bgcolor=#E9E9E9
| 48558 ||  || — || October 9, 1993 || La Silla || E. W. Elst || MRX || align=right | 3.9 km || 
|-id=559 bgcolor=#E9E9E9
| 48559 ||  || — || October 9, 1993 || La Silla || E. W. Elst || — || align=right | 6.7 km || 
|-id=560 bgcolor=#E9E9E9
| 48560 ||  || — || October 20, 1993 || Siding Spring || R. H. McNaught || INO || align=right | 3.3 km || 
|-id=561 bgcolor=#E9E9E9
| 48561 ||  || — || October 21, 1993 || Siding Spring || R. H. McNaught || — || align=right | 7.4 km || 
|-id=562 bgcolor=#E9E9E9
| 48562 ||  || — || October 20, 1993 || La Silla || E. W. Elst || — || align=right | 3.5 km || 
|-id=563 bgcolor=#d6d6d6
| 48563 ||  || — || January 5, 1994 || Kitt Peak || Spacewatch || — || align=right | 5.0 km || 
|-id=564 bgcolor=#E9E9E9
| 48564 ||  || — || January 16, 1994 || Caussols || E. W. Elst, C. Pollas || — || align=right | 6.6 km || 
|-id=565 bgcolor=#fefefe
| 48565 ||  || — || February 8, 1994 || Mérida || O. A. Naranjo || — || align=right | 4.2 km || 
|-id=566 bgcolor=#d6d6d6
| 48566 ||  || — || February 7, 1994 || La Silla || E. W. Elst || THM || align=right | 9.0 km || 
|-id=567 bgcolor=#fefefe
| 48567 ||  || — || February 8, 1994 || La Silla || E. W. Elst || FLO || align=right | 2.8 km || 
|-id=568 bgcolor=#d6d6d6
| 48568 ||  || — || February 8, 1994 || La Silla || E. W. Elst || — || align=right | 5.2 km || 
|-id=569 bgcolor=#d6d6d6
| 48569 || 1994 EN || — || March 6, 1994 || Farra d'Isonzo || Farra d'Isonzo || EOS || align=right | 5.0 km || 
|-id=570 bgcolor=#FA8072
| 48570 ||  || — || March 9, 1994 || Palomar || E. F. Helin || — || align=right | 1.9 km || 
|-id=571 bgcolor=#fefefe
| 48571 ||  || — || March 9, 1994 || Caussols || E. W. Elst || — || align=right | 2.6 km || 
|-id=572 bgcolor=#fefefe
| 48572 ||  || — || March 9, 1994 || Caussols || E. W. Elst || — || align=right | 1.7 km || 
|-id=573 bgcolor=#d6d6d6
| 48573 ||  || — || May 4, 1994 || Kitt Peak || Spacewatch || 7:4* || align=right | 8.5 km || 
|-id=574 bgcolor=#d6d6d6
| 48574 ||  || — || May 4, 1994 || Kitt Peak || Spacewatch || — || align=right | 8.0 km || 
|-id=575 bgcolor=#d6d6d6
| 48575 Hawaii || 1994 NN ||  || July 4, 1994 || Kuma Kogen || A. Nakamura || — || align=right | 6.8 km || 
|-id=576 bgcolor=#fefefe
| 48576 ||  || — || July 11, 1994 || Palomar || C. S. Shoemaker || PHO || align=right | 2.6 km || 
|-id=577 bgcolor=#fefefe
| 48577 ||  || — || August 10, 1994 || La Silla || E. W. Elst || V || align=right | 1.8 km || 
|-id=578 bgcolor=#fefefe
| 48578 ||  || — || August 10, 1994 || La Silla || E. W. Elst || V || align=right | 2.2 km || 
|-id=579 bgcolor=#E9E9E9
| 48579 ||  || — || August 10, 1994 || La Silla || E. W. Elst || — || align=right | 4.3 km || 
|-id=580 bgcolor=#fefefe
| 48580 ||  || — || August 10, 1994 || La Silla || E. W. Elst || — || align=right | 5.2 km || 
|-id=581 bgcolor=#fefefe
| 48581 ||  || — || August 12, 1994 || La Silla || E. W. Elst || NYS || align=right | 2.4 km || 
|-id=582 bgcolor=#fefefe
| 48582 ||  || — || August 12, 1994 || La Silla || E. W. Elst || MAS || align=right | 1.8 km || 
|-id=583 bgcolor=#fefefe
| 48583 ||  || — || August 10, 1994 || La Silla || E. W. Elst || — || align=right | 2.2 km || 
|-id=584 bgcolor=#fefefe
| 48584 ||  || — || August 10, 1994 || La Silla || E. W. Elst || — || align=right | 3.2 km || 
|-id=585 bgcolor=#fefefe
| 48585 ||  || — || August 10, 1994 || La Silla || E. W. Elst || ERI || align=right | 6.1 km || 
|-id=586 bgcolor=#fefefe
| 48586 ||  || — || August 10, 1994 || La Silla || E. W. Elst || V || align=right | 1.7 km || 
|-id=587 bgcolor=#fefefe
| 48587 ||  || — || August 10, 1994 || La Silla || E. W. Elst || — || align=right | 1.6 km || 
|-id=588 bgcolor=#fefefe
| 48588 Raschröder ||  ||  || September 2, 1994 || Tautenburg Observatory || F. Börngen || V || align=right | 1.9 km || 
|-id=589 bgcolor=#fefefe
| 48589 ||  || — || September 3, 1994 || La Silla || E. W. Elst || — || align=right | 2.0 km || 
|-id=590 bgcolor=#fefefe
| 48590 ||  || — || October 2, 1994 || Kitami || K. Endate, K. Watanabe || — || align=right | 11 km || 
|-id=591 bgcolor=#E9E9E9
| 48591 ||  || — || October 2, 1994 || Kitami || K. Endate, K. Watanabe || — || align=right | 4.4 km || 
|-id=592 bgcolor=#fefefe
| 48592 ||  || — || October 4, 1994 || Kitt Peak || Spacewatch || NYS || align=right | 2.1 km || 
|-id=593 bgcolor=#E9E9E9
| 48593 || 1994 VF || — || November 1, 1994 || Oizumi || T. Kobayashi || slow || align=right | 3.0 km || 
|-id=594 bgcolor=#E9E9E9
| 48594 ||  || — || November 3, 1994 || Yatsugatake || Y. Kushida, O. Muramatsu || EUN || align=right | 4.6 km || 
|-id=595 bgcolor=#E9E9E9
| 48595 ||  || — || November 9, 1994 || Oizumi || T. Kobayashi || — || align=right | 5.0 km || 
|-id=596 bgcolor=#E9E9E9
| 48596 ||  || — || November 7, 1994 || Kushiro || S. Ueda, H. Kaneda || — || align=right | 2.3 km || 
|-id=597 bgcolor=#E9E9E9
| 48597 ||  || — || December 3, 1994 || Oizumi || T. Kobayashi || — || align=right | 2.5 km || 
|-id=598 bgcolor=#E9E9E9
| 48598 ||  || — || December 9, 1994 || Oizumi || T. Kobayashi || — || align=right | 2.6 km || 
|-id=599 bgcolor=#E9E9E9
| 48599 || 1994 YS || — || December 28, 1994 || Oizumi || T. Kobayashi || — || align=right | 3.4 km || 
|-id=600 bgcolor=#E9E9E9
| 48600 || 1994 YZ || — || December 28, 1994 || Oizumi || T. Kobayashi || EUN || align=right | 4.1 km || 
|}

48601–48700 

|-bgcolor=#fefefe
| 48601 || 1995 BL || — || January 23, 1995 || Oizumi || T. Kobayashi || H || align=right | 2.5 km || 
|-id=602 bgcolor=#E9E9E9
| 48602 ||  || — || January 27, 1995 || Oizumi || T. Kobayashi || ADE || align=right | 8.4 km || 
|-id=603 bgcolor=#FFC2E0
| 48603 ||  || — || January 30, 1995 || Oizumi || T. Kobayashi || AMO +1km || align=right data-sort-value="0.84" | 840 m || 
|-id=604 bgcolor=#C2FFFF
| 48604 || 1995 CV || — || February 1, 1995 || Kitt Peak || Spacewatch || L5 || align=right | 14 km || 
|-id=605 bgcolor=#E9E9E9
| 48605 ||  || — || February 7, 1995 || Siding Spring || R. H. McNaught || GAL || align=right | 3.8 km || 
|-id=606 bgcolor=#E9E9E9
| 48606 || 1995 DH || — || February 20, 1995 || Oizumi || T. Kobayashi || BRU || align=right | 9.2 km || 
|-id=607 bgcolor=#E9E9E9
| 48607 Yamagatatemodai ||  ||  || February 20, 1995 || Nanyo || T. Okuni || — || align=right | 6.8 km || 
|-id=608 bgcolor=#d6d6d6
| 48608 ||  || — || February 24, 1995 || Kitt Peak || Spacewatch || KOR || align=right | 3.5 km || 
|-id=609 bgcolor=#E9E9E9
| 48609 ||  || — || February 19, 1995 || Kushiro || S. Ueda, H. Kaneda || — || align=right | 3.6 km || 
|-id=610 bgcolor=#E9E9E9
| 48610 ||  || — || March 2, 1995 || Kitt Peak || Spacewatch || — || align=right | 7.4 km || 
|-id=611 bgcolor=#E9E9E9
| 48611 ||  || — || March 23, 1995 || Kitt Peak || Spacewatch || — || align=right | 6.9 km || 
|-id=612 bgcolor=#E9E9E9
| 48612 ||  || — || March 23, 1995 || Kitt Peak || Spacewatch || — || align=right | 5.8 km || 
|-id=613 bgcolor=#fefefe
| 48613 ||  || — || March 27, 1995 || Kitt Peak || Spacewatch || — || align=right | 1.9 km || 
|-id=614 bgcolor=#d6d6d6
| 48614 ||  || — || March 27, 1995 || Kitt Peak || Spacewatch || — || align=right | 6.8 km || 
|-id=615 bgcolor=#d6d6d6
| 48615 ||  || — || March 28, 1995 || Kitt Peak || Spacewatch || — || align=right | 7.0 km || 
|-id=616 bgcolor=#E9E9E9
| 48616 ||  || — || April 2, 1995 || Xinglong || SCAP || — || align=right | 8.2 km || 
|-id=617 bgcolor=#d6d6d6
| 48617 ||  || — || April 25, 1995 || Kitt Peak || Spacewatch || — || align=right | 4.7 km || 
|-id=618 bgcolor=#E9E9E9
| 48618 ||  || — || April 26, 1995 || Kitt Peak || Spacewatch || — || align=right | 5.0 km || 
|-id=619 bgcolor=#fefefe
| 48619 Jianli || 1995 KV ||  || May 21, 1995 || Xinglong || SCAP || — || align=right | 1.6 km || 
|-id=620 bgcolor=#d6d6d6
| 48620 ||  || — || June 23, 1995 || Kitt Peak || Spacewatch || TEL || align=right | 3.8 km || 
|-id=621 bgcolor=#FA8072
| 48621 || 1995 OC || — || July 19, 1995 || Cavezzo || Cavezzo Obs. || — || align=right | 1.9 km || 
|-id=622 bgcolor=#fefefe
| 48622 ||  || — || July 30, 1995 || Kitt Peak || Spacewatch || FLO || align=right | 1.6 km || 
|-id=623 bgcolor=#fefefe
| 48623 ||  || — || July 22, 1995 || Kitt Peak || Spacewatch || FLO || align=right | 1.2 km || 
|-id=624 bgcolor=#fefefe
| 48624 Sadayuki || 1995 PM ||  || August 4, 1995 || Nanyo || T. Okuni || — || align=right | 3.9 km || 
|-id=625 bgcolor=#fefefe
| 48625 || 1995 QF || — || August 16, 1995 || Church Stretton || S. P. Laurie || FLO || align=right | 1.6 km || 
|-id=626 bgcolor=#fefefe
| 48626 ||  || — || August 20, 1995 || Kitt Peak || Spacewatch || V || align=right | 1.9 km || 
|-id=627 bgcolor=#fefefe
| 48627 ||  || — || August 28, 1995 || Kitt Peak || Spacewatch || FLO || align=right | 4.5 km || 
|-id=628 bgcolor=#fefefe
| 48628 Janetfender || 1995 RD ||  || September 7, 1995 || Haleakala || AMOS || — || align=right | 2.5 km || 
|-id=629 bgcolor=#fefefe
| 48629 || 1995 SP || — || September 18, 1995 || Ondřejov || L. Kotková || — || align=right | 3.4 km || 
|-id=630 bgcolor=#fefefe
| 48630 ||  || — || September 17, 1995 || Kitt Peak || Spacewatch || — || align=right | 1.8 km || 
|-id=631 bgcolor=#fefefe
| 48631 Hasantufan ||  ||  || September 26, 1995 || Zelenchukskaya || T. V. Kryachko || FLO || align=right | 2.0 km || 
|-id=632 bgcolor=#fefefe
| 48632 ||  || — || September 29, 1995 || Church Stretton || S. P. Laurie || — || align=right | 2.2 km || 
|-id=633 bgcolor=#E9E9E9
| 48633 ||  || — || September 24, 1995 || Kitt Peak || Spacewatch || — || align=right | 4.7 km || 
|-id=634 bgcolor=#d6d6d6
| 48634 ||  || — || September 25, 1995 || Kitt Peak || Spacewatch || 7:4 || align=right | 11 km || 
|-id=635 bgcolor=#fefefe
| 48635 ||  || — || September 20, 1995 || Kitami || K. Endate, K. Watanabe || — || align=right | 2.4 km || 
|-id=636 bgcolor=#fefefe
| 48636 Huangkun ||  ||  || September 28, 1995 || Xinglong || SCAP || — || align=right | 1.5 km || 
|-id=637 bgcolor=#fefefe
| 48637 ||  || — || September 26, 1995 || Kitt Peak || Spacewatch || FLO || align=right | 1.6 km || 
|-id=638 bgcolor=#fefefe
| 48638 Třebíč || 1995 TB ||  || October 3, 1995 || Kleť || M. Tichý || — || align=right | 2.0 km || 
|-id=639 bgcolor=#C2E0FF
| 48639 ||  || — || October 15, 1995 || Steward Observatory || A. Gleason || other TNOmoon || align=right | 458 km || 
|-id=640 bgcolor=#fefefe
| 48640 Eziobosso || 1995 UD ||  || October 17, 1995 || Sormano || P. Sicoli, P. Ghezzi || — || align=right | 2.2 km || 
|-id=641 bgcolor=#fefefe
| 48641 ||  || — || October 20, 1995 || Višnjan Observatory || K. Korlević, V. Brcic || V || align=right | 2.3 km || 
|-id=642 bgcolor=#fefefe
| 48642 ||  || — || October 23, 1995 || Sudbury || D. di Cicco || V || align=right | 1.7 km || 
|-id=643 bgcolor=#fefefe
| 48643 Allen-Beach ||  ||  || October 20, 1995 || Sormano || P. Sicoli, F. Manca || — || align=right | 2.1 km || 
|-id=644 bgcolor=#fefefe
| 48644 ||  || — || October 27, 1995 || Kushiro || S. Ueda, H. Kaneda || V || align=right | 2.6 km || 
|-id=645 bgcolor=#fefefe
| 48645 ||  || — || October 27, 1995 || Oizumi || T. Kobayashi || — || align=right | 6.0 km || 
|-id=646 bgcolor=#fefefe
| 48646 ||  || — || October 27, 1995 || Oizumi || T. Kobayashi || NYS || align=right | 2.1 km || 
|-id=647 bgcolor=#fefefe
| 48647 ||  || — || October 27, 1995 || Kushiro || S. Ueda, H. Kaneda || — || align=right | 2.4 km || 
|-id=648 bgcolor=#fefefe
| 48648 ||  || — || October 17, 1995 || Kitt Peak || Spacewatch || NYS || align=right | 2.1 km || 
|-id=649 bgcolor=#fefefe
| 48649 ||  || — || October 21, 1995 || Kitt Peak || Spacewatch || FLO || align=right | 1.6 km || 
|-id=650 bgcolor=#fefefe
| 48650 Kazanuniversity ||  ||  || October 17, 1995 || Zelenchukskaya || V. Y. Solovyov || — || align=right | 3.7 km || 
|-id=651 bgcolor=#fefefe
| 48651 ||  || — || October 22, 1995 || Kitt Peak || Spacewatch || NYS || align=right | 1.9 km || 
|-id=652 bgcolor=#fefefe
| 48652 || 1995 VB || — || November 1, 1995 || Oizumi || T. Kobayashi || FLO || align=right | 2.2 km || 
|-id=653 bgcolor=#fefefe
| 48653 || 1995 VD || — || November 1, 1995 || Oizumi || T. Kobayashi || — || align=right | 2.9 km || 
|-id=654 bgcolor=#fefefe
| 48654 ||  || — || November 15, 1995 || Kitt Peak || Spacewatch || MAS || align=right | 1.3 km || 
|-id=655 bgcolor=#fefefe
| 48655 ||  || — || November 15, 1995 || Kitt Peak || Spacewatch || — || align=right | 2.1 km || 
|-id=656 bgcolor=#fefefe
| 48656 ||  || — || November 15, 1995 || Kitt Peak || Spacewatch || — || align=right | 2.0 km || 
|-id=657 bgcolor=#fefefe
| 48657 || 1995 WK || — || November 16, 1995 || Oizumi || T. Kobayashi || V || align=right | 1.9 km || 
|-id=658 bgcolor=#fefefe
| 48658 ||  || — || November 16, 1995 || Kushiro || S. Ueda, H. Kaneda || FLO || align=right | 2.3 km || 
|-id=659 bgcolor=#fefefe
| 48659 ||  || — || November 16, 1995 || Kitt Peak || Spacewatch || FLO || align=right | 2.0 km || 
|-id=660 bgcolor=#fefefe
| 48660 ||  || — || November 24, 1995 || Oizumi || T. Kobayashi || — || align=right | 2.0 km || 
|-id=661 bgcolor=#fefefe
| 48661 ||  || — || November 24, 1995 || Oizumi || T. Kobayashi || — || align=right | 2.2 km || 
|-id=662 bgcolor=#fefefe
| 48662 ||  || — || November 24, 1995 || Oizumi || T. Kobayashi || — || align=right | 2.4 km || 
|-id=663 bgcolor=#fefefe
| 48663 ||  || — || November 29, 1995 || Oizumi || T. Kobayashi || — || align=right | 2.3 km || 
|-id=664 bgcolor=#fefefe
| 48664 ||  || — || November 16, 1995 || Kitt Peak || Spacewatch || FLO || align=right | 2.3 km || 
|-id=665 bgcolor=#fefefe
| 48665 ||  || — || November 18, 1995 || Kitt Peak || Spacewatch || FLO || align=right | 1.6 km || 
|-id=666 bgcolor=#fefefe
| 48666 ||  || — || November 17, 1995 || Kitt Peak || Spacewatch || NYS || align=right | 1.5 km || 
|-id=667 bgcolor=#fefefe
| 48667 ||  || — || November 20, 1995 || Kitt Peak || Spacewatch || FLO || align=right | 2.1 km || 
|-id=668 bgcolor=#d6d6d6
| 48668 ||  || — || December 15, 1995 || Oizumi || T. Kobayashi || — || align=right | 15 km || 
|-id=669 bgcolor=#fefefe
| 48669 ||  || — || December 21, 1995 || Oizumi || T. Kobayashi || V || align=right | 1.9 km || 
|-id=670 bgcolor=#fefefe
| 48670 ||  || — || December 26, 1995 || Oizumi || T. Kobayashi || — || align=right | 3.3 km || 
|-id=671 bgcolor=#fefefe
| 48671 ||  || — || December 27, 1995 || Oizumi || T. Kobayashi || — || align=right | 3.3 km || 
|-id=672 bgcolor=#fefefe
| 48672 ||  || — || December 16, 1995 || Kitt Peak || Spacewatch || NYS || align=right | 4.3 km || 
|-id=673 bgcolor=#E9E9E9
| 48673 ||  || — || December 20, 1995 || Kitt Peak || Spacewatch || — || align=right | 2.6 km || 
|-id=674 bgcolor=#fefefe
| 48674 ||  || — || December 17, 1995 || Xinglong || SCAP || — || align=right | 3.2 km || 
|-id=675 bgcolor=#fefefe
| 48675 ||  || — || December 21, 1995 || Haleakala || NEAT || MAS || align=right | 1.9 km || 
|-id=676 bgcolor=#fefefe
| 48676 ||  || — || January 12, 1996 || Kitt Peak || Spacewatch || NYS || align=right | 1.5 km || 
|-id=677 bgcolor=#fefefe
| 48677 ||  || — || January 12, 1996 || Kitt Peak || Spacewatch || NYS || align=right | 1.5 km || 
|-id=678 bgcolor=#fefefe
| 48678 ||  || — || January 15, 1996 || Kitt Peak || Spacewatch || — || align=right | 2.1 km || 
|-id=679 bgcolor=#fefefe
| 48679 ||  || — || January 15, 1996 || Kitt Peak || Spacewatch || V || align=right | 1.9 km || 
|-id=680 bgcolor=#fefefe
| 48680 || 1996 BU || — || January 17, 1996 || Kitami || K. Endate, K. Watanabe || — || align=right | 2.7 km || 
|-id=681 bgcolor=#fefefe
| 48681 Zeilinger || 1996 BZ ||  || January 21, 1996 || Linz || E. Meyer, E. Obermair || — || align=right | 3.2 km || 
|-id=682 bgcolor=#fefefe
| 48682 ||  || — || January 23, 1996 || Oizumi || T. Kobayashi || — || align=right | 2.4 km || 
|-id=683 bgcolor=#fefefe
| 48683 ||  || — || January 23, 1996 || Oizumi || T. Kobayashi || — || align=right | 1.8 km || 
|-id=684 bgcolor=#fefefe
| 48684 || 1996 EP || — || March 14, 1996 || Sudbury || D. di Cicco || NYS || align=right | 2.5 km || 
|-id=685 bgcolor=#E9E9E9
| 48685 || 1996 EW || — || March 15, 1996 || Haleakala || NEAT || — || align=right | 3.6 km || 
|-id=686 bgcolor=#E9E9E9
| 48686 ||  || — || March 10, 1996 || Kitami || K. Endate, K. Watanabe || — || align=right | 3.4 km || 
|-id=687 bgcolor=#E9E9E9
| 48687 ||  || — || March 11, 1996 || Kitt Peak || Spacewatch || EUN || align=right | 2.3 km || 
|-id=688 bgcolor=#fefefe
| 48688 ||  || — || March 17, 1996 || Haleakala || NEAT || — || align=right | 2.5 km || 
|-id=689 bgcolor=#E9E9E9
| 48689 ||  || — || April 8, 1996 || Xinglong || SCAP || HNS || align=right | 6.2 km || 
|-id=690 bgcolor=#E9E9E9
| 48690 ||  || — || April 11, 1996 || Kitt Peak || Spacewatch || — || align=right | 4.8 km || 
|-id=691 bgcolor=#E9E9E9
| 48691 ||  || — || April 12, 1996 || Kitt Peak || Spacewatch || HEN || align=right | 3.2 km || 
|-id=692 bgcolor=#E9E9E9
| 48692 ||  || — || April 15, 1996 || La Silla || E. W. Elst || — || align=right | 7.0 km || 
|-id=693 bgcolor=#E9E9E9
| 48693 ||  || — || April 15, 1996 || La Silla || E. W. Elst || — || align=right | 2.9 km || 
|-id=694 bgcolor=#E9E9E9
| 48694 || 1996 HP || — || April 18, 1996 || Ondřejov || L. Kotková || EUN || align=right | 4.8 km || 
|-id=695 bgcolor=#E9E9E9
| 48695 ||  || — || April 18, 1996 || Kitt Peak || Spacewatch || — || align=right | 3.0 km || 
|-id=696 bgcolor=#E9E9E9
| 48696 ||  || — || April 17, 1996 || La Silla || E. W. Elst || — || align=right | 4.4 km || 
|-id=697 bgcolor=#E9E9E9
| 48697 ||  || — || April 17, 1996 || La Silla || E. W. Elst || — || align=right | 3.1 km || 
|-id=698 bgcolor=#E9E9E9
| 48698 ||  || — || April 18, 1996 || La Silla || E. W. Elst || AST || align=right | 6.4 km || 
|-id=699 bgcolor=#E9E9E9
| 48699 ||  || — || April 18, 1996 || La Silla || E. W. Elst || — || align=right | 7.8 km || 
|-id=700 bgcolor=#E9E9E9
| 48700 Hanggao ||  ||  || April 17, 1996 || Xinglong || SCAP || — || align=right | 3.7 km || 
|}

48701–48800 

|-bgcolor=#E9E9E9
| 48701 ||  || — || April 18, 1996 || Xinglong || SCAP || EUN || align=right | 3.9 km || 
|-id=702 bgcolor=#E9E9E9
| 48702 || 1996 JE || — || May 6, 1996 || Lime Creek || R. Linderholm || MAR || align=right | 3.0 km || 
|-id=703 bgcolor=#fefefe
| 48703 || 1996 JQ || — || May 12, 1996 || Prescott || P. G. Comba || H || align=right | 1.3 km || 
|-id=704 bgcolor=#E9E9E9
| 48704 ||  || — || May 14, 1996 || Xinglong || SCAP || — || align=right | 10 km || 
|-id=705 bgcolor=#E9E9E9
| 48705 ||  || — || May 9, 1996 || Kitt Peak || Spacewatch || — || align=right | 3.4 km || 
|-id=706 bgcolor=#d6d6d6
| 48706 ||  || — || May 12, 1996 || Kitt Peak || Spacewatch || — || align=right | 3.5 km || 
|-id=707 bgcolor=#fefefe
| 48707 ||  || — || May 19, 1996 || Xinglong || SCAP || Hslow || align=right | 1.5 km || 
|-id=708 bgcolor=#E9E9E9
| 48708 ||  || — || June 8, 1996 || Kitt Peak || Spacewatch || — || align=right | 3.6 km || 
|-id=709 bgcolor=#fefefe
| 48709 ||  || — || June 11, 1996 || Kitt Peak || Spacewatch || V || align=right | 1.4 km || 
|-id=710 bgcolor=#E9E9E9
| 48710 ||  || — || June 8, 1996 || Kitt Peak || Spacewatch || — || align=right | 6.6 km || 
|-id=711 bgcolor=#d6d6d6
| 48711 ||  || — || July 14, 1996 || La Silla || E. W. Elst || THM || align=right | 7.9 km || 
|-id=712 bgcolor=#d6d6d6
| 48712 ||  || — || July 26, 1996 || Haleakala || AMOS || — || align=right | 3.2 km || 
|-id=713 bgcolor=#d6d6d6
| 48713 ||  || — || August 9, 1996 || Haleakala || NEAT || HYG || align=right | 8.1 km || 
|-id=714 bgcolor=#d6d6d6
| 48714 ||  || — || August 8, 1996 || La Silla || E. W. Elst || — || align=right | 7.8 km || 
|-id=715 bgcolor=#d6d6d6
| 48715 Balbinot ||  ||  || September 13, 1996 || Bologna || San Vittore Obs. || HYG || align=right | 9.3 km || 
|-id=716 bgcolor=#d6d6d6
| 48716 ||  || — || September 13, 1996 || Prescott || P. G. Comba || — || align=right | 6.9 km || 
|-id=717 bgcolor=#d6d6d6
| 48717 ||  || — || September 15, 1996 || Catalina Station || T. B. Spahr || EUP || align=right | 11 km || 
|-id=718 bgcolor=#d6d6d6
| 48718 ||  || — || September 13, 1996 || Kitt Peak || Spacewatch || — || align=right | 7.9 km || 
|-id=719 bgcolor=#d6d6d6
| 48719 ||  || — || September 13, 1996 || Haleakala || NEAT || — || align=right | 8.6 km || 
|-id=720 bgcolor=#fefefe
| 48720 Enricomentana ||  ||  || September 29, 1996 || Colleverde || V. S. Casulli || — || align=right | 2.4 km || 
|-id=721 bgcolor=#d6d6d6
| 48721 ||  || — || October 17, 1996 || Kitt Peak || Spacewatch || EOS || align=right | 6.5 km || 
|-id=722 bgcolor=#d6d6d6
| 48722 ||  || — || November 8, 1996 || Kitt Peak || Spacewatch || — || align=right | 11 km || 
|-id=723 bgcolor=#fefefe
| 48723 ||  || — || December 8, 1996 || Kitt Peak || Spacewatch || — || align=right | 1.9 km || 
|-id=724 bgcolor=#fefefe
| 48724 ||  || — || December 8, 1996 || Xinglong || SCAP || NYS || align=right | 2.1 km || 
|-id=725 bgcolor=#fefefe
| 48725 ||  || — || January 2, 1997 || Oizumi || T. Kobayashi || FLO || align=right | 3.8 km || 
|-id=726 bgcolor=#fefefe
| 48726 ||  || — || January 10, 1997 || Oizumi || T. Kobayashi || — || align=right | 2.3 km || 
|-id=727 bgcolor=#fefefe
| 48727 ||  || — || January 15, 1997 || Kleť || Kleť Obs. || — || align=right | 2.1 km || 
|-id=728 bgcolor=#fefefe
| 48728 ||  || — || January 11, 1997 || Kitt Peak || Spacewatch || — || align=right | 2.3 km || 
|-id=729 bgcolor=#fefefe
| 48729 ||  || — || January 14, 1997 || Modra || P. Kolény, L. Kornoš || — || align=right | 1.9 km || 
|-id=730 bgcolor=#fefefe
| 48730 ||  || — || January 30, 1997 || Oizumi || T. Kobayashi || — || align=right | 2.3 km || 
|-id=731 bgcolor=#fefefe
| 48731 ||  || — || January 31, 1997 || Oizumi || T. Kobayashi || — || align=right | 2.9 km || 
|-id=732 bgcolor=#fefefe
| 48732 ||  || — || February 3, 1997 || Kleť || Kleť Obs. || — || align=right | 1.6 km || 
|-id=733 bgcolor=#fefefe
| 48733 ||  || — || February 3, 1997 || Haleakala || NEAT || V || align=right | 1.6 km || 
|-id=734 bgcolor=#fefefe
| 48734 ||  || — || February 6, 1997 || Chichibu || N. Satō || V || align=right | 2.2 km || 
|-id=735 bgcolor=#fefefe
| 48735 ||  || — || February 12, 1997 || Oizumi || T. Kobayashi || — || align=right | 2.4 km || 
|-id=736 bgcolor=#fefefe
| 48736 Ehime || 1997 DL ||  || February 27, 1997 || Kuma Kogen || A. Nakamura || — || align=right | 2.6 km || 
|-id=737 bgcolor=#fefefe
| 48737 Cusinato ||  ||  || March 8, 1997 || Pianoro || V. Goretti || — || align=right | 2.6 km || 
|-id=738 bgcolor=#fefefe
| 48738 ||  || — || March 5, 1997 || Kitt Peak || Spacewatch || MAS || align=right | 1.5 km || 
|-id=739 bgcolor=#fefefe
| 48739 ||  || — || March 3, 1997 || Kitami || K. Endate, K. Watanabe || V || align=right | 2.0 km || 
|-id=740 bgcolor=#fefefe
| 48740 ||  || — || March 11, 1997 || Kitt Peak || Spacewatch || — || align=right | 2.1 km || 
|-id=741 bgcolor=#fefefe
| 48741 ||  || — || March 10, 1997 || Socorro || LINEAR || NYS || align=right | 1.7 km || 
|-id=742 bgcolor=#fefefe
| 48742 ||  || — || March 12, 1997 || La Silla || E. W. Elst || — || align=right | 1.8 km || 
|-id=743 bgcolor=#fefefe
| 48743 ||  || — || March 10, 1997 || La Silla || E. W. Elst || NYS || align=right | 1.5 km || 
|-id=744 bgcolor=#fefefe
| 48744 ||  || — || March 31, 1997 || Socorro || LINEAR || — || align=right | 2.6 km || 
|-id=745 bgcolor=#fefefe
| 48745 || 1997 GA || — || April 1, 1997 || Modra || Modra Obs. || — || align=right | 1.9 km || 
|-id=746 bgcolor=#fefefe
| 48746 ||  || — || April 2, 1997 || Kitt Peak || Spacewatch || NYS || align=right | 1.4 km || 
|-id=747 bgcolor=#fefefe
| 48747 ||  || — || April 7, 1997 || Kitt Peak || Spacewatch || FLO || align=right | 1.4 km || 
|-id=748 bgcolor=#fefefe
| 48748 ||  || — || April 3, 1997 || Kitami || K. Endate, K. Watanabe || V || align=right | 2.1 km || 
|-id=749 bgcolor=#fefefe
| 48749 ||  || — || April 2, 1997 || Socorro || LINEAR || NYS || align=right | 1.8 km || 
|-id=750 bgcolor=#fefefe
| 48750 ||  || — || April 2, 1997 || Socorro || LINEAR || V || align=right | 2.0 km || 
|-id=751 bgcolor=#fefefe
| 48751 ||  || — || April 2, 1997 || Socorro || LINEAR || V || align=right | 2.2 km || 
|-id=752 bgcolor=#fefefe
| 48752 ||  || — || April 3, 1997 || Socorro || LINEAR || V || align=right | 1.7 km || 
|-id=753 bgcolor=#fefefe
| 48753 ||  || — || April 3, 1997 || Socorro || LINEAR || — || align=right | 2.6 km || 
|-id=754 bgcolor=#E9E9E9
| 48754 ||  || — || April 6, 1997 || Socorro || LINEAR || — || align=right | 2.3 km || 
|-id=755 bgcolor=#fefefe
| 48755 ||  || — || April 7, 1997 || Socorro || LINEAR || NYS || align=right | 1.9 km || 
|-id=756 bgcolor=#fefefe
| 48756 Yoshiharukuni ||  ||  || April 11, 1997 || Nanyo || T. Okuni || NYS || align=right | 2.6 km || 
|-id=757 bgcolor=#fefefe
| 48757 ||  || — || April 3, 1997 || Socorro || LINEAR || NYS || align=right | 1.9 km || 
|-id=758 bgcolor=#fefefe
| 48758 ||  || — || April 6, 1997 || Socorro || LINEAR || — || align=right | 3.5 km || 
|-id=759 bgcolor=#fefefe
| 48759 ||  || — || April 6, 1997 || Socorro || LINEAR || — || align=right | 3.2 km || 
|-id=760 bgcolor=#E9E9E9
| 48760 ||  || — || April 30, 1997 || Socorro || LINEAR || — || align=right | 2.5 km || 
|-id=761 bgcolor=#fefefe
| 48761 ||  || — || April 30, 1997 || Socorro || LINEAR || V || align=right | 2.4 km || 
|-id=762 bgcolor=#fefefe
| 48762 ||  || — || April 30, 1997 || Socorro || LINEAR || EUT || align=right | 1.9 km || 
|-id=763 bgcolor=#fefefe
| 48763 || 1997 JZ || — || May 2, 1997 || Xinglong || SCAP || — || align=right | 4.4 km || 
|-id=764 bgcolor=#C2FFFF
| 48764 ||  || — || May 5, 1997 || Kitt Peak || Spacewatch || L5 || align=right | 28 km || 
|-id=765 bgcolor=#fefefe
| 48765 ||  || — || May 3, 1997 || La Silla || E. W. Elst || NYS || align=right | 2.1 km || 
|-id=766 bgcolor=#fefefe
| 48766 ||  || — || May 3, 1997 || La Silla || E. W. Elst || EUT || align=right | 2.6 km || 
|-id=767 bgcolor=#C2FFFF
| 48767 Skamander ||  ||  || May 3, 1997 || La Silla || E. W. Elst || L5 || align=right | 22 km || 
|-id=768 bgcolor=#E9E9E9
| 48768 || 1997 KE || — || May 29, 1997 || Kitt Peak || Spacewatch || — || align=right | 3.9 km || 
|-id=769 bgcolor=#E9E9E9
| 48769 || 1997 MJ || — || June 26, 1997 || Kitt Peak || Spacewatch || — || align=right | 3.1 km || 
|-id=770 bgcolor=#E9E9E9
| 48770 ||  || — || June 28, 1997 || Socorro || LINEAR || — || align=right | 3.5 km || 
|-id=771 bgcolor=#E9E9E9
| 48771 ||  || — || June 27, 1997 || Kitt Peak || Spacewatch || — || align=right | 2.9 km || 
|-id=772 bgcolor=#E9E9E9
| 48772 ||  || — || June 27, 1997 || Kitt Peak || Spacewatch || — || align=right | 3.1 km || 
|-id=773 bgcolor=#E9E9E9
| 48773 || 1997 PS || — || August 3, 1997 || Caussols || ODAS || ADE || align=right | 6.7 km || 
|-id=774 bgcolor=#E9E9E9
| 48774 Anngower ||  ||  || August 10, 1997 || NRC-DAO || D. D. Balam || — || align=right | 5.3 km || 
|-id=775 bgcolor=#E9E9E9
| 48775 || 1997 QL || — || August 24, 1997 || Kleť || Z. Moravec || — || align=right | 6.0 km || 
|-id=776 bgcolor=#d6d6d6
| 48776 || 1997 QT || — || August 27, 1997 || Kleť || Z. Moravec || TRP || align=right | 5.8 km || 
|-id=777 bgcolor=#E9E9E9
| 48777 ||  || — || August 25, 1997 || Reedy Creek || J. Broughton || — || align=right | 6.0 km || 
|-id=778 bgcolor=#E9E9E9
| 48778 Shokoyukako || 1997 RE ||  || September 1, 1997 || Yatsuka || H. Abe || GEF || align=right | 3.9 km || 
|-id=779 bgcolor=#E9E9E9
| 48779 Mariko || 1997 RH ||  || September 1, 1997 || Yatsuka || H. Abe || HEN || align=right | 2.8 km || 
|-id=780 bgcolor=#d6d6d6
| 48780 ||  || — || September 4, 1997 || Caussols || ODAS || — || align=right | 5.5 km || 
|-id=781 bgcolor=#d6d6d6
| 48781 || 1997 SL || — || September 20, 1997 || Ondřejov || L. Kotková || — || align=right | 5.1 km || 
|-id=782 bgcolor=#E9E9E9
| 48782 Fierz || 1997 SP ||  || September 20, 1997 || Ondřejov || L. Kotková || — || align=right | 3.5 km || 
|-id=783 bgcolor=#E9E9E9
| 48783 || 1997 SR || — || September 20, 1997 || Woomera || F. B. Zoltowski || — || align=right | 5.7 km || 
|-id=784 bgcolor=#d6d6d6
| 48784 || 1997 SX || — || September 17, 1997 || Xinglong || SCAP || EOS || align=right | 7.5 km || 
|-id=785 bgcolor=#d6d6d6
| 48785 Pitter ||  ||  || September 23, 1997 || Ondřejov || P. Pravec || — || align=right | 8.1 km || 
|-id=786 bgcolor=#d6d6d6
| 48786 ||  || — || September 27, 1997 || Oizumi || T. Kobayashi || — || align=right | 8.1 km || 
|-id=787 bgcolor=#E9E9E9
| 48787 ||  || — || September 26, 1997 || Woomera || F. B. Zoltowski || — || align=right | 2.9 km || 
|-id=788 bgcolor=#E9E9E9
| 48788 ||  || — || September 23, 1997 || Kitt Peak || Spacewatch || — || align=right | 4.7 km || 
|-id=789 bgcolor=#E9E9E9
| 48789 ||  || — || September 28, 1997 || Kitt Peak || Spacewatch || — || align=right | 6.7 km || 
|-id=790 bgcolor=#d6d6d6
| 48790 ||  || — || September 30, 1997 || Kitt Peak || Spacewatch || KOR || align=right | 3.0 km || 
|-id=791 bgcolor=#d6d6d6
| 48791 ||  || — || September 29, 1997 || Kitt Peak || Spacewatch || THM || align=right | 5.7 km || 
|-id=792 bgcolor=#d6d6d6
| 48792 ||  || — || September 17, 1997 || Xinglong || SCAP || — || align=right | 4.8 km || 
|-id=793 bgcolor=#E9E9E9
| 48793 ||  || — || October 4, 1997 || Kitt Peak || Spacewatch || WIT || align=right | 2.4 km || 
|-id=794 bgcolor=#d6d6d6
| 48794 Stolzová ||  ||  || October 5, 1997 || Kleť || J. Tichá, M. Tichý || CHA || align=right | 4.4 km || 
|-id=795 bgcolor=#d6d6d6
| 48795 ||  || — || October 6, 1997 || Ondřejov || P. Pravec || — || align=right | 4.9 km || 
|-id=796 bgcolor=#E9E9E9
| 48796 ||  || — || October 3, 1997 || Kitt Peak || Spacewatch || GEF || align=right | 2.9 km || 
|-id=797 bgcolor=#d6d6d6
| 48797 ||  || — || October 2, 1997 || Kitt Peak || Spacewatch || KOR || align=right | 3.6 km || 
|-id=798 bgcolor=#E9E9E9
| 48798 Penghuanwu ||  ||  || October 6, 1997 || Xinglong || SCAP || GEF || align=right | 4.2 km || 
|-id=799 bgcolor=#d6d6d6
| 48799 Tashikuergan ||  ||  || October 8, 1997 || Xinglong || Xinglong Stn. || KOR || align=right | 3.0 km || 
|-id=800 bgcolor=#d6d6d6
| 48800 ||  || — || October 5, 1997 || Kitt Peak || Spacewatch || KOR || align=right | 3.8 km || 
|}

48801–48900 

|-bgcolor=#E9E9E9
| 48801 Penninger ||  ||  || October 22, 1997 || Linz || E. Meyer || DOR || align=right | 6.7 km || 
|-id=802 bgcolor=#d6d6d6
| 48802 ||  || — || October 25, 1997 || Kitami || K. Endate, K. Watanabe || THM || align=right | 8.7 km || 
|-id=803 bgcolor=#d6d6d6
| 48803 ||  || — || October 29, 1997 || Haleakala || NEAT || — || align=right | 6.0 km || 
|-id=804 bgcolor=#d6d6d6
| 48804 ||  || — || October 23, 1997 || Kitt Peak || Spacewatch || KOR || align=right | 2.7 km || 
|-id=805 bgcolor=#d6d6d6
| 48805 ||  || — || October 23, 1997 || Kitt Peak || Spacewatch || — || align=right | 6.3 km || 
|-id=806 bgcolor=#d6d6d6
| 48806 ||  || — || October 30, 1997 || Xinglong || SCAP || — || align=right | 6.9 km || 
|-id=807 bgcolor=#d6d6d6
| 48807 Takahata ||  ||  || October 22, 1997 || Nanyo || T. Okuni || — || align=right | 5.0 km || 
|-id=808 bgcolor=#d6d6d6
| 48808 ||  || — || November 6, 1997 || Oizumi || T. Kobayashi || — || align=right | 7.1 km || 
|-id=809 bgcolor=#d6d6d6
| 48809 ||  || — || November 4, 1997 || Nachi-Katsuura || Y. Shimizu, T. Urata || — || align=right | 6.1 km || 
|-id=810 bgcolor=#E9E9E9
| 48810 ||  || — || November 14, 1997 || Stroncone || Santa Lucia Obs. || WAT || align=right | 5.6 km || 
|-id=811 bgcolor=#d6d6d6
| 48811 || 1997 WH || — || November 18, 1997 || Oizumi || T. Kobayashi || — || align=right | 9.1 km || 
|-id=812 bgcolor=#E9E9E9
| 48812 || 1997 WL || — || November 18, 1997 || Oizumi || T. Kobayashi || — || align=right | 9.9 km || 
|-id=813 bgcolor=#d6d6d6
| 48813 ||  || — || November 19, 1997 || Xinglong || SCAP || EOS || align=right | 4.2 km || 
|-id=814 bgcolor=#d6d6d6
| 48814 ||  || — || November 23, 1997 || Oizumi || T. Kobayashi || — || align=right | 11 km || 
|-id=815 bgcolor=#d6d6d6
| 48815 ||  || — || November 23, 1997 || Oizumi || T. Kobayashi || — || align=right | 6.6 km || 
|-id=816 bgcolor=#E9E9E9
| 48816 ||  || — || November 19, 1997 || Xinglong || SCAP || — || align=right | 3.7 km || 
|-id=817 bgcolor=#d6d6d6
| 48817 ||  || — || November 21, 1997 || Kitt Peak || Spacewatch || HYG || align=right | 9.4 km || 
|-id=818 bgcolor=#d6d6d6
| 48818 ||  || — || November 23, 1997 || Kitt Peak || Spacewatch || THM || align=right | 7.8 km || 
|-id=819 bgcolor=#d6d6d6
| 48819 ||  || — || November 25, 1997 || Kitt Peak || Spacewatch || — || align=right | 8.4 km || 
|-id=820 bgcolor=#d6d6d6
| 48820 ||  || — || November 29, 1997 || Socorro || LINEAR || THM || align=right | 7.5 km || 
|-id=821 bgcolor=#d6d6d6
| 48821 ||  || — || November 29, 1997 || Socorro || LINEAR || — || align=right | 7.7 km || 
|-id=822 bgcolor=#d6d6d6
| 48822 ||  || — || November 29, 1997 || Socorro || LINEAR || — || align=right | 4.8 km || 
|-id=823 bgcolor=#d6d6d6
| 48823 ||  || — || November 29, 1997 || Socorro || LINEAR || ALA || align=right | 13 km || 
|-id=824 bgcolor=#E9E9E9
| 48824 ||  || — || November 29, 1997 || Socorro || LINEAR || — || align=right | 7.2 km || 
|-id=825 bgcolor=#d6d6d6
| 48825 ||  || — || November 26, 1997 || Haleakala || NEAT || — || align=right | 8.0 km || 
|-id=826 bgcolor=#d6d6d6
| 48826 ||  || — || November 29, 1997 || Socorro || LINEAR || THM || align=right | 8.1 km || 
|-id=827 bgcolor=#d6d6d6
| 48827 || 1997 YB || — || December 18, 1997 || Oizumi || T. Kobayashi || — || align=right | 8.3 km || 
|-id=828 bgcolor=#d6d6d6
| 48828 || 1997 YU || — || December 20, 1997 || Oizumi || T. Kobayashi || — || align=right | 8.1 km || 
|-id=829 bgcolor=#d6d6d6
| 48829 ||  || — || December 17, 1997 || Xinglong || SCAP || — || align=right | 5.7 km || 
|-id=830 bgcolor=#d6d6d6
| 48830 ||  || — || December 21, 1997 || Oizumi || T. Kobayashi || — || align=right | 9.9 km || 
|-id=831 bgcolor=#d6d6d6
| 48831 ||  || — || December 24, 1997 || Oizumi || T. Kobayashi || EOS || align=right | 6.6 km || 
|-id=832 bgcolor=#d6d6d6
| 48832 ||  || — || December 22, 1997 || Xinglong || SCAP || — || align=right | 17 km || 
|-id=833 bgcolor=#E9E9E9
| 48833 ||  || — || December 24, 1997 || Woomera || F. B. Zoltowski || — || align=right | 12 km || 
|-id=834 bgcolor=#fefefe
| 48834 ||  || — || December 27, 1997 || Haleakala || NEAT || H || align=right | 2.3 km || 
|-id=835 bgcolor=#d6d6d6
| 48835 ||  || — || December 22, 1997 || Xinglong || SCAP || EOS || align=right | 6.5 km || 
|-id=836 bgcolor=#d6d6d6
| 48836 || 1998 AW || — || January 5, 1998 || Oizumi || T. Kobayashi || — || align=right | 11 km || 
|-id=837 bgcolor=#d6d6d6
| 48837 ||  || — || January 4, 1998 || Xinglong || SCAP || 7:4 || align=right | 9.3 km || 
|-id=838 bgcolor=#d6d6d6
| 48838 ||  || — || January 15, 1998 || Caussols || ODAS || — || align=right | 6.5 km || 
|-id=839 bgcolor=#d6d6d6
| 48839 ||  || — || January 19, 1998 || Uenohara || N. Kawasato || — || align=right | 5.9 km || 
|-id=840 bgcolor=#d6d6d6
| 48840 ||  || — || January 17, 1998 || Caussols || ODAS || — || align=right | 11 km || 
|-id=841 bgcolor=#d6d6d6
| 48841 ||  || — || January 27, 1998 || Sormano || A. Testa, P. Ghezzi || — || align=right | 12 km || 
|-id=842 bgcolor=#d6d6d6
| 48842 Alexmazzanti ||  ||  || January 25, 1998 || Cima Ekar || M. Tombelli, G. Forti || URS || align=right | 17 km || 
|-id=843 bgcolor=#d6d6d6
| 48843 ||  || — || January 22, 1998 || Socorro || LINEAR || EOS || align=right | 9.7 km || 
|-id=844 bgcolor=#fefefe
| 48844 Belloves || 1998 DW ||  || February 18, 1998 || Kleť || M. Tichý, Z. Moravec || H || align=right | 1.1 km || 
|-id=845 bgcolor=#d6d6d6
| 48845 ||  || — || February 23, 1998 || Kitt Peak || Spacewatch || HYG || align=right | 7.1 km || 
|-id=846 bgcolor=#fefefe
| 48846 ||  || — || February 27, 1998 || Caussols || ODAS || — || align=right | 2.1 km || 
|-id=847 bgcolor=#fefefe
| 48847 ||  || — || March 3, 1998 || Caussols || ODAS || H || align=right | 2.4 km || 
|-id=848 bgcolor=#fefefe
| 48848 ||  || — || March 20, 1998 || Socorro || LINEAR || — || align=right | 1.4 km || 
|-id=849 bgcolor=#fefefe
| 48849 ||  || — || March 20, 1998 || Socorro || LINEAR || FLO || align=right | 1.5 km || 
|-id=850 bgcolor=#fefefe
| 48850 ||  || — || March 20, 1998 || Socorro || LINEAR || — || align=right | 1.5 km || 
|-id=851 bgcolor=#fefefe
| 48851 ||  || — || March 20, 1998 || Socorro || LINEAR || — || align=right | 3.2 km || 
|-id=852 bgcolor=#fefefe
| 48852 ||  || — || March 20, 1998 || Socorro || LINEAR || — || align=right | 1.6 km || 
|-id=853 bgcolor=#fefefe
| 48853 ||  || — || March 24, 1998 || Socorro || LINEAR || NYS || align=right | 2.2 km || 
|-id=854 bgcolor=#E9E9E9
| 48854 ||  || — || March 24, 1998 || Socorro || LINEAR || — || align=right | 4.3 km || 
|-id=855 bgcolor=#d6d6d6
| 48855 ||  || — || March 31, 1998 || Socorro || LINEAR || — || align=right | 11 km || 
|-id=856 bgcolor=#fefefe
| 48856 ||  || — || March 31, 1998 || Socorro || LINEAR || FLO || align=right | 2.9 km || 
|-id=857 bgcolor=#E9E9E9
| 48857 ||  || — || March 20, 1998 || Socorro || LINEAR || EUN || align=right | 2.9 km || 
|-id=858 bgcolor=#fefefe
| 48858 ||  || — || April 19, 1998 || Kitt Peak || Spacewatch || — || align=right | 2.2 km || 
|-id=859 bgcolor=#fefefe
| 48859 ||  || — || April 24, 1998 || Kitt Peak || Spacewatch || — || align=right | 1.8 km || 
|-id=860 bgcolor=#fefefe
| 48860 ||  || — || April 24, 1998 || Majorca || Á. López J., R. Pacheco || — || align=right | 2.1 km || 
|-id=861 bgcolor=#fefefe
| 48861 ||  || — || April 24, 1998 || Višnjan Observatory || Višnjan Obs. || FLO || align=right | 2.6 km || 
|-id=862 bgcolor=#fefefe
| 48862 ||  || — || April 20, 1998 || Socorro || LINEAR || — || align=right | 2.9 km || 
|-id=863 bgcolor=#fefefe
| 48863 ||  || — || April 20, 1998 || Socorro || LINEAR || — || align=right | 2.0 km || 
|-id=864 bgcolor=#FA8072
| 48864 ||  || — || April 25, 1998 || Višnjan Observatory || Višnjan Obs. || — || align=right | 2.3 km || 
|-id=865 bgcolor=#d6d6d6
| 48865 ||  || — || April 20, 1998 || Socorro || LINEAR || — || align=right | 4.0 km || 
|-id=866 bgcolor=#fefefe
| 48866 ||  || — || April 25, 1998 || Anderson Mesa || LONEOS || FLO || align=right | 3.1 km || 
|-id=867 bgcolor=#fefefe
| 48867 ||  || — || April 21, 1998 || Socorro || LINEAR || — || align=right | 3.6 km || 
|-id=868 bgcolor=#fefefe
| 48868 ||  || — || April 21, 1998 || Socorro || LINEAR || — || align=right | 1.8 km || 
|-id=869 bgcolor=#fefefe
| 48869 ||  || — || April 21, 1998 || Socorro || LINEAR || — || align=right | 1.8 km || 
|-id=870 bgcolor=#fefefe
| 48870 ||  || — || April 21, 1998 || Socorro || LINEAR || FLO || align=right | 2.3 km || 
|-id=871 bgcolor=#fefefe
| 48871 ||  || — || April 21, 1998 || Socorro || LINEAR || — || align=right | 2.0 km || 
|-id=872 bgcolor=#fefefe
| 48872 ||  || — || April 21, 1998 || Socorro || LINEAR || — || align=right | 3.7 km || 
|-id=873 bgcolor=#fefefe
| 48873 ||  || — || April 21, 1998 || Socorro || LINEAR || — || align=right | 2.0 km || 
|-id=874 bgcolor=#fefefe
| 48874 ||  || — || April 21, 1998 || Socorro || LINEAR || — || align=right | 1.9 km || 
|-id=875 bgcolor=#fefefe
| 48875 ||  || — || April 25, 1998 || La Silla || E. W. Elst || — || align=right | 2.0 km || 
|-id=876 bgcolor=#fefefe
| 48876 ||  || — || April 25, 1998 || La Silla || E. W. Elst || FLO || align=right | 4.8 km || 
|-id=877 bgcolor=#fefefe
| 48877 ||  || — || April 23, 1998 || Socorro || LINEAR || FLO || align=right | 1.6 km || 
|-id=878 bgcolor=#d6d6d6
| 48878 ||  || — || April 23, 1998 || Socorro || LINEAR || INA || align=right | 11 km || 
|-id=879 bgcolor=#fefefe
| 48879 ||  || — || April 23, 1998 || Socorro || LINEAR || FLO || align=right | 1.4 km || 
|-id=880 bgcolor=#fefefe
| 48880 ||  || — || April 19, 1998 || Socorro || LINEAR || — || align=right | 1.6 km || 
|-id=881 bgcolor=#d6d6d6
| 48881 ||  || — || April 20, 1998 || Socorro || LINEAR || 3:2 || align=right | 17 km || 
|-id=882 bgcolor=#fefefe
| 48882 ||  || — || April 21, 1998 || Socorro || LINEAR || — || align=right | 1.6 km || 
|-id=883 bgcolor=#fefefe
| 48883 ||  || — || April 25, 1998 || La Silla || E. W. Elst || — || align=right | 1.9 km || 
|-id=884 bgcolor=#fefefe
| 48884 ||  || — || April 25, 1998 || La Silla || E. W. Elst || NYS || align=right | 1.5 km || 
|-id=885 bgcolor=#fefefe
| 48885 ||  || — || April 27, 1998 || Kitt Peak || Spacewatch || — || align=right | 1.4 km || 
|-id=886 bgcolor=#fefefe
| 48886 Jonanderson ||  ||  || May 7, 1998 || Caussols || ODAS || — || align=right | 2.1 km || 
|-id=887 bgcolor=#fefefe
| 48887 ||  || — || May 22, 1998 || Anderson Mesa || LONEOS || FLO || align=right | 1.9 km || 
|-id=888 bgcolor=#fefefe
| 48888 REXIS ||  ||  || May 22, 1998 || Anderson Mesa || LONEOS || FLO || align=right | 1.6 km || 
|-id=889 bgcolor=#fefefe
| 48889 ||  || — || May 24, 1998 || Xinglong || SCAP || FLO || align=right | 2.5 km || 
|-id=890 bgcolor=#fefefe
| 48890 ||  || — || May 22, 1998 || Socorro || LINEAR || — || align=right | 2.5 km || 
|-id=891 bgcolor=#fefefe
| 48891 ||  || — || May 22, 1998 || Socorro || LINEAR || FLO || align=right | 2.4 km || 
|-id=892 bgcolor=#fefefe
| 48892 ||  || — || May 22, 1998 || Socorro || LINEAR || — || align=right | 2.7 km || 
|-id=893 bgcolor=#fefefe
| 48893 ||  || — || May 22, 1998 || Socorro || LINEAR || — || align=right | 2.2 km || 
|-id=894 bgcolor=#fefefe
| 48894 ||  || — || May 22, 1998 || Socorro || LINEAR || — || align=right | 2.2 km || 
|-id=895 bgcolor=#fefefe
| 48895 ||  || — || May 22, 1998 || Socorro || LINEAR || — || align=right | 2.4 km || 
|-id=896 bgcolor=#fefefe
| 48896 ||  || — || May 22, 1998 || Socorro || LINEAR || — || align=right | 1.7 km || 
|-id=897 bgcolor=#fefefe
| 48897 ||  || — || June 1, 1998 || La Silla || E. W. Elst || — || align=right | 1.4 km || 
|-id=898 bgcolor=#fefefe
| 48898 ||  || — || June 19, 1998 || Socorro || LINEAR || PHO || align=right | 4.8 km || 
|-id=899 bgcolor=#fefefe
| 48899 ||  || — || June 17, 1998 || Woomera || F. B. Zoltowski || — || align=right | 2.8 km || 
|-id=900 bgcolor=#fefefe
| 48900 ||  || — || June 24, 1998 || Socorro || LINEAR || — || align=right | 3.0 km || 
|}

48901–49000 

|-bgcolor=#fefefe
| 48901 ||  || — || June 24, 1998 || Socorro || LINEAR || — || align=right | 1.9 km || 
|-id=902 bgcolor=#fefefe
| 48902 ||  || — || June 24, 1998 || Socorro || LINEAR || FLO || align=right | 3.2 km || 
|-id=903 bgcolor=#fefefe
| 48903 ||  || — || June 24, 1998 || Socorro || LINEAR || — || align=right | 2.9 km || 
|-id=904 bgcolor=#fefefe
| 48904 ||  || — || June 24, 1998 || Socorro || LINEAR || FLO || align=right | 2.1 km || 
|-id=905 bgcolor=#fefefe
| 48905 ||  || — || June 24, 1998 || Socorro || LINEAR || FLO || align=right | 1.8 km || 
|-id=906 bgcolor=#fefefe
| 48906 ||  || — || June 24, 1998 || Socorro || LINEAR || V || align=right | 1.8 km || 
|-id=907 bgcolor=#fefefe
| 48907 ||  || — || June 27, 1998 || Kitt Peak || Spacewatch || V || align=right | 1.8 km || 
|-id=908 bgcolor=#fefefe
| 48908 ||  || — || June 26, 1998 || La Silla || E. W. Elst || FLO || align=right | 1.7 km || 
|-id=909 bgcolor=#fefefe
| 48909 Laurake ||  ||  || June 26, 1998 || La Silla || E. W. Elst || — || align=right | 1.7 km || 
|-id=910 bgcolor=#fefefe
| 48910 ||  || — || June 28, 1998 || La Silla || E. W. Elst || NYS || align=right | 1.5 km || 
|-id=911 bgcolor=#fefefe
| 48911 ||  || — || June 20, 1998 || Haleakala || NEAT || — || align=right | 2.5 km || 
|-id=912 bgcolor=#fefefe
| 48912 ||  || — || July 24, 1998 || Prescott || P. G. Comba || — || align=right | 2.7 km || 
|-id=913 bgcolor=#fefefe
| 48913 ||  || — || July 25, 1998 || Prescott || P. G. Comba || MAS || align=right | 4.4 km || 
|-id=914 bgcolor=#fefefe
| 48914 ||  || — || July 27, 1998 || Caussols || ODAS || FLO || align=right | 1.7 km || 
|-id=915 bgcolor=#fefefe
| 48915 ||  || — || July 29, 1998 || Caussols || ODAS || — || align=right | 1.6 km || 
|-id=916 bgcolor=#fefefe
| 48916 ||  || — || July 26, 1998 || Anderson Mesa || LONEOS || — || align=right | 2.5 km || 
|-id=917 bgcolor=#fefefe
| 48917 ||  || — || July 26, 1998 || Anderson Mesa || LONEOS || — || align=right | 2.2 km || 
|-id=918 bgcolor=#fefefe
| 48918 ||  || — || July 26, 1998 || La Silla || E. W. Elst || — || align=right | 2.7 km || 
|-id=919 bgcolor=#fefefe
| 48919 ||  || — || July 26, 1998 || La Silla || E. W. Elst || — || align=right | 3.8 km || 
|-id=920 bgcolor=#fefefe
| 48920 ||  || — || July 26, 1998 || La Silla || E. W. Elst || MAS || align=right | 1.4 km || 
|-id=921 bgcolor=#fefefe
| 48921 ||  || — || July 26, 1998 || La Silla || E. W. Elst || — || align=right | 2.6 km || 
|-id=922 bgcolor=#fefefe
| 48922 ||  || — || July 26, 1998 || La Silla || E. W. Elst || NYS || align=right | 1.7 km || 
|-id=923 bgcolor=#fefefe
| 48923 ||  || — || July 22, 1998 || Reedy Creek || J. Broughton || NYS || align=right | 1.8 km || 
|-id=924 bgcolor=#fefefe
| 48924 ||  || — || July 29, 1998 || Reedy Creek || J. Broughton || V || align=right | 2.5 km || 
|-id=925 bgcolor=#fefefe
| 48925 ||  || — || July 26, 1998 || La Silla || E. W. Elst || NYS || align=right | 2.6 km || 
|-id=926 bgcolor=#fefefe
| 48926 ||  || — || July 26, 1998 || La Silla || E. W. Elst || V || align=right | 1.9 km || 
|-id=927 bgcolor=#fefefe
| 48927 ||  || — || July 26, 1998 || La Silla || E. W. Elst || — || align=right | 5.9 km || 
|-id=928 bgcolor=#fefefe
| 48928 || 1998 PB || — || August 2, 1998 || Anderson Mesa || LONEOS || — || align=right | 2.8 km || 
|-id=929 bgcolor=#fefefe
| 48929 || 1998 PC || — || August 2, 1998 || Anderson Mesa || LONEOS || — || align=right | 2.2 km || 
|-id=930 bgcolor=#fefefe
| 48930 || 1998 PW || — || August 14, 1998 || Woomera || F. B. Zoltowski || — || align=right | 1.5 km || 
|-id=931 bgcolor=#fefefe
| 48931 ||  || — || August 10, 1998 || Reedy Creek || J. Broughton || ERI || align=right | 4.4 km || 
|-id=932 bgcolor=#fefefe
| 48932 || 1998 QB || — || August 17, 1998 || Višnjan Observatory || Višnjan Obs. || V || align=right | 2.8 km || 
|-id=933 bgcolor=#fefefe
| 48933 || 1998 QD || — || August 17, 1998 || Prescott || P. G. Comba || NYS || align=right | 1.3 km || 
|-id=934 bgcolor=#fefefe
| 48934 Kočanová || 1998 QS ||  || August 18, 1998 || Modra || D. Kalmančok, A. Pravda || NYS || align=right | 1.5 km || 
|-id=935 bgcolor=#fefefe
| 48935 ||  || — || August 17, 1998 || Višnjan Observatory || Višnjan Obs. || V || align=right | 2.4 km || 
|-id=936 bgcolor=#fefefe
| 48936 ||  || — || August 20, 1998 || Kitt Peak || Spacewatch || FLO || align=right | 2.0 km || 
|-id=937 bgcolor=#fefefe
| 48937 ||  || — || August 21, 1998 || Woomera || F. B. Zoltowski || — || align=right | 3.9 km || 
|-id=938 bgcolor=#fefefe
| 48938 ||  || — || August 22, 1998 || Xinglong || SCAP || FLO || align=right | 1.7 km || 
|-id=939 bgcolor=#fefefe
| 48939 ||  || — || August 17, 1998 || Socorro || LINEAR || V || align=right | 2.0 km || 
|-id=940 bgcolor=#fefefe
| 48940 ||  || — || August 17, 1998 || Socorro || LINEAR || — || align=right | 3.6 km || 
|-id=941 bgcolor=#E9E9E9
| 48941 ||  || — || August 17, 1998 || Socorro || LINEAR || EUN || align=right | 3.1 km || 
|-id=942 bgcolor=#fefefe
| 48942 ||  || — || August 17, 1998 || Socorro || LINEAR || FLO || align=right | 1.8 km || 
|-id=943 bgcolor=#fefefe
| 48943 ||  || — || August 17, 1998 || Socorro || LINEAR || V || align=right | 1.6 km || 
|-id=944 bgcolor=#fefefe
| 48944 ||  || — || August 17, 1998 || Socorro || LINEAR || — || align=right | 1.9 km || 
|-id=945 bgcolor=#fefefe
| 48945 ||  || — || August 17, 1998 || Socorro || LINEAR || NYS || align=right | 1.7 km || 
|-id=946 bgcolor=#fefefe
| 48946 ||  || — || August 17, 1998 || Socorro || LINEAR || FLO || align=right | 2.6 km || 
|-id=947 bgcolor=#E9E9E9
| 48947 ||  || — || August 17, 1998 || Socorro || LINEAR || — || align=right | 4.3 km || 
|-id=948 bgcolor=#fefefe
| 48948 ||  || — || August 17, 1998 || Socorro || LINEAR || — || align=right | 2.4 km || 
|-id=949 bgcolor=#fefefe
| 48949 ||  || — || August 17, 1998 || Socorro || LINEAR || — || align=right | 2.1 km || 
|-id=950 bgcolor=#fefefe
| 48950 ||  || — || August 17, 1998 || Socorro || LINEAR || — || align=right | 1.9 km || 
|-id=951 bgcolor=#fefefe
| 48951 ||  || — || August 17, 1998 || Socorro || LINEAR || — || align=right | 2.0 km || 
|-id=952 bgcolor=#fefefe
| 48952 ||  || — || August 17, 1998 || Socorro || LINEAR || — || align=right | 2.4 km || 
|-id=953 bgcolor=#fefefe
| 48953 ||  || — || August 17, 1998 || Socorro || LINEAR || ERI || align=right | 2.4 km || 
|-id=954 bgcolor=#fefefe
| 48954 ||  || — || August 17, 1998 || Socorro || LINEAR || — || align=right | 3.0 km || 
|-id=955 bgcolor=#fefefe
| 48955 ||  || — || August 17, 1998 || Socorro || LINEAR || NYS || align=right | 3.8 km || 
|-id=956 bgcolor=#fefefe
| 48956 ||  || — || August 17, 1998 || Socorro || LINEAR || V || align=right | 1.7 km || 
|-id=957 bgcolor=#fefefe
| 48957 ||  || — || August 17, 1998 || Socorro || LINEAR || FLO || align=right | 2.0 km || 
|-id=958 bgcolor=#fefefe
| 48958 ||  || — || August 25, 1998 || Višnjan Observatory || Višnjan Obs. || NYS || align=right | 2.1 km || 
|-id=959 bgcolor=#fefefe
| 48959 ||  || — || August 24, 1998 || Reedy Creek || J. Broughton || NYS || align=right | 4.2 km || 
|-id=960 bgcolor=#fefefe
| 48960 Clouet ||  ||  || August 25, 1998 || Blauvac || R. Roy || NYS || align=right | 1.7 km || 
|-id=961 bgcolor=#fefefe
| 48961 ||  || — || August 22, 1998 || Majorca || Á. López J., R. Pacheco || — || align=right | 2.6 km || 
|-id=962 bgcolor=#fefefe
| 48962 ||  || — || August 17, 1998 || Socorro || LINEAR || NYS || align=right | 1.5 km || 
|-id=963 bgcolor=#fefefe
| 48963 ||  || — || August 17, 1998 || Socorro || LINEAR || V || align=right | 2.2 km || 
|-id=964 bgcolor=#fefefe
| 48964 ||  || — || August 17, 1998 || Socorro || LINEAR || NYS || align=right | 1.7 km || 
|-id=965 bgcolor=#fefefe
| 48965 ||  || — || August 17, 1998 || Socorro || LINEAR || — || align=right | 2.3 km || 
|-id=966 bgcolor=#fefefe
| 48966 ||  || — || August 17, 1998 || Socorro || LINEAR || V || align=right | 2.0 km || 
|-id=967 bgcolor=#fefefe
| 48967 ||  || — || August 17, 1998 || Socorro || LINEAR || FLO || align=right | 1.8 km || 
|-id=968 bgcolor=#fefefe
| 48968 ||  || — || August 17, 1998 || Socorro || LINEAR || V || align=right | 2.9 km || 
|-id=969 bgcolor=#fefefe
| 48969 ||  || — || August 17, 1998 || Socorro || LINEAR || — || align=right | 2.7 km || 
|-id=970 bgcolor=#fefefe
| 48970 ||  || — || August 17, 1998 || Socorro || LINEAR || — || align=right | 2.2 km || 
|-id=971 bgcolor=#fefefe
| 48971 ||  || — || August 17, 1998 || Socorro || LINEAR || NYS || align=right | 2.4 km || 
|-id=972 bgcolor=#fefefe
| 48972 ||  || — || August 17, 1998 || Socorro || LINEAR || NYS || align=right | 1.9 km || 
|-id=973 bgcolor=#fefefe
| 48973 ||  || — || August 17, 1998 || Socorro || LINEAR || — || align=right | 1.8 km || 
|-id=974 bgcolor=#fefefe
| 48974 ||  || — || August 17, 1998 || Socorro || LINEAR || NYS || align=right | 1.9 km || 
|-id=975 bgcolor=#fefefe
| 48975 ||  || — || August 17, 1998 || Socorro || LINEAR || — || align=right | 3.3 km || 
|-id=976 bgcolor=#fefefe
| 48976 ||  || — || August 17, 1998 || Socorro || LINEAR || — || align=right | 3.2 km || 
|-id=977 bgcolor=#fefefe
| 48977 ||  || — || August 17, 1998 || Socorro || LINEAR || V || align=right | 2.3 km || 
|-id=978 bgcolor=#E9E9E9
| 48978 ||  || — || August 17, 1998 || Socorro || LINEAR || RAF || align=right | 3.4 km || 
|-id=979 bgcolor=#fefefe
| 48979 ||  || — || August 17, 1998 || Socorro || LINEAR || FLO || align=right | 3.1 km || 
|-id=980 bgcolor=#fefefe
| 48980 ||  || — || August 17, 1998 || Socorro || LINEAR || — || align=right | 4.0 km || 
|-id=981 bgcolor=#fefefe
| 48981 ||  || — || August 17, 1998 || Socorro || LINEAR || V || align=right | 3.7 km || 
|-id=982 bgcolor=#E9E9E9
| 48982 ||  || — || August 17, 1998 || Socorro || LINEAR || MAR || align=right | 3.7 km || 
|-id=983 bgcolor=#fefefe
| 48983 ||  || — || August 17, 1998 || Socorro || LINEAR || — || align=right | 2.9 km || 
|-id=984 bgcolor=#fefefe
| 48984 ||  || — || August 17, 1998 || Socorro || LINEAR || NYS || align=right | 2.0 km || 
|-id=985 bgcolor=#fefefe
| 48985 ||  || — || August 17, 1998 || Socorro || LINEAR || — || align=right | 3.3 km || 
|-id=986 bgcolor=#fefefe
| 48986 ||  || — || August 17, 1998 || Socorro || LINEAR || FLO || align=right | 3.2 km || 
|-id=987 bgcolor=#fefefe
| 48987 ||  || — || August 17, 1998 || Socorro || LINEAR || — || align=right | 1.9 km || 
|-id=988 bgcolor=#fefefe
| 48988 ||  || — || August 17, 1998 || Socorro || LINEAR || NYS || align=right | 2.1 km || 
|-id=989 bgcolor=#fefefe
| 48989 ||  || — || August 17, 1998 || Socorro || LINEAR || — || align=right | 2.1 km || 
|-id=990 bgcolor=#fefefe
| 48990 ||  || — || August 17, 1998 || Socorro || LINEAR || ERI || align=right | 3.3 km || 
|-id=991 bgcolor=#fefefe
| 48991 ||  || — || August 17, 1998 || Socorro || LINEAR || V || align=right | 2.0 km || 
|-id=992 bgcolor=#fefefe
| 48992 ||  || — || August 17, 1998 || Socorro || LINEAR || — || align=right | 2.7 km || 
|-id=993 bgcolor=#fefefe
| 48993 ||  || — || August 17, 1998 || Socorro || LINEAR || V || align=right | 2.7 km || 
|-id=994 bgcolor=#fefefe
| 48994 ||  || — || August 17, 1998 || Socorro || LINEAR || — || align=right | 2.0 km || 
|-id=995 bgcolor=#fefefe
| 48995 ||  || — || August 17, 1998 || Socorro || LINEAR || FLO || align=right | 2.7 km || 
|-id=996 bgcolor=#fefefe
| 48996 ||  || — || August 17, 1998 || Socorro || LINEAR || — || align=right | 2.4 km || 
|-id=997 bgcolor=#fefefe
| 48997 ||  || — || August 17, 1998 || Socorro || LINEAR || V || align=right | 3.5 km || 
|-id=998 bgcolor=#fefefe
| 48998 ||  || — || August 17, 1998 || Socorro || LINEAR || — || align=right | 3.6 km || 
|-id=999 bgcolor=#fefefe
| 48999 ||  || — || August 17, 1998 || Socorro || LINEAR || V || align=right | 2.4 km || 
|-id=000 bgcolor=#fefefe
| 49000 ||  || — || August 20, 1998 || Anderson Mesa || LONEOS || — || align=right | 2.5 km || 
|}

References

External links 
 Discovery Circumstances: Numbered Minor Planets (45001)–(50000) (IAU Minor Planet Center)

0048